= Norsk Polar Navigasjon =

Norsk Polar Navigasjon A/S ("Norwegian Polar Navigation") was a company which attempted to build an airport and later conducted petroleum drilling in Svalbard, Norway.

== Airport ==
Einar Sverre Pedesen's first idea for an airport in Svalbard was born during the Second World War, when he was searching for German submarines in the Arctic Ocean. After the war he let his plans mature and he gradually saw the potential for a commercial airport in the archipelago, as an increasing number of routes would run close to the North Pole. Specifically, he envisioned that the airport would serve as an emergency landing aerodrome for intercontinental flights, and proposed that the Norwegian trunk airline service be extended to Svalbard and that his airport be established as a hub. He first published the idea in Polarboken 1954.

The brothers, Einar Sverre Pedersen and Gunnar Sverre Pedersen, went on an expedition to Spitsbergen in 1956 to conduct further surveys. Their initial observations concluded with that Kvadehussletta, the outermost part of Brøggerhalvøya, outside Ny-Ålesund, was the best-suited places for a major airport. The initially planned for a 1,600-meter (5,200 ft) long runway, which could easily be expanded to 3,000 meters (9,800 ft). Hotellneset and Adventdalen, both close to Longyearbyen, were rejected because the areas were too small and due to poor weather conditions.

The first media coverage of the issue was in Aftenposten in 1956, and on 19 July, the editorial in Dagbladet stated that it was a "dangerous airport". This was followed up on 26 July by the Soviet newspaper Izvestia with the title "Hunting for new bases" and drew parallels to the then contentious issue with Iceland's Naval Air Station Keflavik.

Initially the Pedersen brothers launched the idea for the Government of Norway and SAS, but neither party was interested in investing in an airport. At a meeting in Trondheim on 6 August 1957, the brothers decided to establish a limited company which would build a private airport on Svalbard. They contacted Kings Bay Kull Comp., which owned and operated the mining community of Ny-Ålesund, and ask for permission to build an airport on their land. On 17 September 1958, the company responded that they were willing to negotiate an agreement, given that the airport remained under Norwegian ownership and regulations.

Norsk Polar Navigasjon was established on 21 October 1958 and had an initial owner equity of 3,000 Norwegian krone (NOK). The following day, negotiations started with Vestlandske Flyselskap to start an airline service from the mainland to Svalbard. The discussions resulted in the intention to establish Norsk Arktis Flyselskap ("Norwegian Arctic Airline") to serve Spitsbergen, Bjørnøya, Jan Mayen and East Greenland. To generate revenue, the Pedersen brothers proposed establishing the Roald Amundsen Institute in Ny-Ålesund. It would act as a hotel during the summer and provide cheap accommodation for researchers during the winter, while generating patronage for the airport. An agreement was struck with Hilton Hotels to build the hotel.

The brothers secured some political support, particularly from Bjarne Støtvig of the Conservative Party, but also other parliamentarians bought shares in the company. The company made a formal inquiry to the Ministry of Trade and Industry in 1958 to establish if an airport would be permitted in accordance with the Svalbard Treaty. The issue was forwarded to the Ministry of Foreign Affairs, which responded 10 July that a purely civilian airport would not violate the treaty. Minister Halvard Lange of the Labour Party stated that the authorities were positive to any civilian activity which could generate business not related to coal mining on the archipelago. Helge Seip of the Liberal Party (Norway) raised concerns in Parliament on 5 November that the airport was being proposed by a colonel (Gunnar Sverre Pedersen) and that it could cause militarization on Svalbard, but the issues were rejected by Lange.

On 29 November, the Soviet Ministry of Foreign Affairs issued a memorandum to the Norwegian Embassy stating that they regarded the plans as part of the North Atlantic Treaty Organization's strategy for construction of air station. Thus they claimed that the construction was a violation of the treaty. The Norwegian Cabinet of State drafted a response which rejected the claims, but which added that no financing was secured and thus that construction was unrealistic.

During the fall of 1958, Einar Sverre Pedersen took contact with his acquaintance US colonel Joseph O. Fletcher, working for the Military Assistance Advisory Group, who again brought Einar Sverre Pedersen in contact with the Arctic Institute of North America (AINA). Gunnar Sverre Pedersen also contacted O. D. Lærum at the Norwegian Institute of Technology, and the three parties signed an agreement on 1 January 1959 in which AINA granted 20,000 United States dollars towards investigating the establishment of roads and airports on Svalbard.

The Norwegian authority's concerns about the airport was largely related to the increased strategic importance of the Arctic Ocean in the Cold War. Specifically, the authorities were concerned either that the airport could result in the Soviet Union building an airport at one of its settlements in Svalbard and that in case of war, the Soviet Union would occupy the airport at Kvadehuksletta. There was also concern that the Soviet Union's reactions would be intensified because the plans were being carried out by an ex-officer and planning had in part been financed through US military funding. The work to not realize the airport was led by the Ministry of Foreign Affairs and the Ministry of Defence, although a certain support for the project was found in the Ministry of Transport and Communications and the Ministry of Trade and Industry, which made the negotiations more complicated.

In January, the Ministry of Trade and Industry discovered that Norsk Polar Navigasjon had secured sufficient financing and that construction would be imminent. A meeting between the ministry and Gunnar Sverre Pedersen was held the following day. Pedersen stated that if the authorities wanted to terminate the project, he was willing to do so, but expected an ex gratia payment in return. A memorandum to the Soviet Union was posted on 10 January. The Pedersen brothers disagreed fundamentally with the government's assessment. They felt that the Norwegian authorities took too much consideration to the Soviet Union's preferences and that an airport on Svalbard not only was well within the permissions of the treaty, but also would act as a guarantee for Norwegian sovereignty over the archipelago.

To reduce public debate about the issue, in an effort to accommodate Soviet desires, State Secretary Olaf Solumsmoen asked the media to not write about the airport. On 8 January, Minister of Trade and Industry Gustav Sjaastad instructed Kings Bay, which was owned by the ministry, to terminate any negotiations regarding leasing or sale of property for the establishment of an airport. The Pedersens contacted Kings Bay on 20 January and offered to make a tentative agreement whereby the lease would start from the time the political situation allowed for construction as long as their company was compensated. A press release was from the ministry was issued on 22 February which stated that Kings Bay would not issue any land for an airport. On 26 January, Lange informed the Enlarged Committee on Foreign Affairs in Parliament about the issue, and received broad political support for the government's line of action. The following day, a meeting took place between the Norwegian Ambassador and Soviet Ministry of Foreign Affairs.

On 22 February, the Pdersen brothers suggested to the Ministry of Foreign Affairs that they instead build a smaller airport at Kapp Mitra, across the fjord from Ny-Ålesund. This was rejected by the ministry, stating that the fundamental issue was that Norway had no way of hindering the Soviet Union from occupying the airports in case of war. Two additional locations were later proposed by the Pedersen brothers, at Kapp Guissez near Ny-Ålesund and Adventdalen. These were planned built sufficiently small that they could not be used by jet aircraft, but also these proposals were rejected by the ministry.

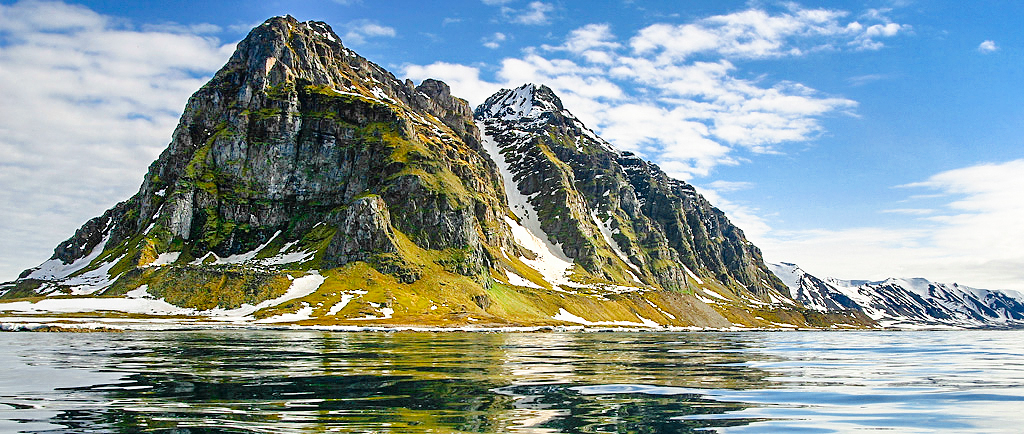
Fuglehuken, the northernmost part of Prins Karls Forland, was one of the proposed airport sites

After Gunnar Sverre Pedersen conducted a study trip to France and the United States in March and April 1959, he and Lærum led an expedition to Svalbard in the summer. This resulted in a report, Svalbardveg 1959, which recommended that up to six airport be built. Four were proposed in the area around Nu-Ålesund: at Fuglehuken, the northernmost point of Prins Karls Forland, at Kvadehuken, at Kapp Guissez and at Kapp Mitra. Two were proposed in Nordenskiöld Land, at Kapp Linné, near Isfjord Radio, and in Adventdalen, near Longyearbyen. For 1960, a US$64,000 grant was awarded by the United States Department of the Air Force to conduct further investigations, mostly regarding weather and ground conditions.

In 1959, Colonel Gunnar Sverre Pedersen changed his line of argument. He emphasized that the Royal Norwegian Air Force was using a natural air strip in Adventdalen and that military aircraft had used it during the search for the American satellite Discoverer-2 earlier that year. He also pointed out that German interest were planned an airport and that Widerøe was in need of an airport to perform aerial photography of the archipelago.

In September, the Ministry of Trade and Industry instructed all state-owned mining companies on Svalbard that they were not to negotiate any rights to lease or sell land for airports. The American support worried Norwegian authorities and was discussed at a Paris meeting between Lange and United States Secretary of State, Christian Herter, in December 1959. A memorandum to the United States to stop funding was issued on 12 January 1960, resulting in AINA withdrawing the grant and instead issuing $5,000 to complete the previous year's study.

As a counter-measure, Norsk Polar Navigasjon applied on 3 November 1959 to use the ice runway in Adventdalen for charter flights. At the same time, the government assessed that Colonel Gunnar Sverre Pedersen's rank as an officer was complicating the relationship with the Soviet Union. In a letter dated 23 January 1960, Minister of Defence Nils Handal asked Colonel Gunnar Sverre Pedersen to resign as chairman of the company's board, stating that his position as an officer did not harmonize with his interests to establish an airport on Svalbard. His brother, Einar Sverre Pedersen, replaced him as chairman on 30 January. Nils Langhelle took the initiative that Einar Sverre Pedersen's employer, SAS, ask him to abandon the plans to work with the airport or risk losing his job. Einar Sverre Pedersen refused to sign the agreement. The Ministry of Education and Research issued a latter to Lærum asking him to withdraw from the project.

From February 1960, Norsk Polar Navigasjon focused on petroleum instead of aviation. In addition to the financial gains finding oil could give, the Pedersen brothers also wanted to create demand for aviation services on the archipelago. The authorities, after advice from both the Governor of Svalbard and the Norwegian Intelligence Service, feared that the company's primary goal with oil exploration was to gain mineral rights for land which they subsequently could use to build an airport. To further dilute the company's plans, they were, unlike the American Caltex and Soviet Arktikugol, not permitted to use helicopters in their petroleum activities. Colonel Gunnar Sverre Pedersen was also denied leave of absence by his employer to visit Svalbard.

The Ministry of Transport took a legislative approach. A new act regarding aerodromes was passed on 16 December 1960, which required a government concession to build, operate or own an aerodrome. Although the law took effect in metropolitan Norway on 1 January 1962, it was decided that it would take effect from 9 March 1961. This resulted in Norrønafly applying for concession in March, followed by Norsk Polar Navigasjon shortly afterwards. The issue was discussed in the Cabinet of State on 13 April, with the outcome that the government would continue to only allow Air Force aircraft to deliver post and provide air ambulance services.

The political aspect was further aggravated following the U-2 incident and Soviet authorities again began asking questions about the airports and in particular the American funding. In its response, the Norwegian authorities differentiated between a publicly owned civilian airport, which they emphasized the Norwegian sovereignty of the archipelago gave the authorities the right to build, and the right to build a private airport, which would fall under the treaty's clause of nondiscrimination. The interest in the matter was taken up by Soviet media, who wrote that it was an American airport which was being planned.

Up to this point, the government had largely been placing the question on hold and taking measure to reduce public debate about the issue. As Soviet interest in the issue increased, the Norwegian government was increasingly experiencing the issue as a strain on the Norway–Soviet Union relations. This resulted in the government needing to finalize the discussion once and for all. Norwegian Prime Minister Einar Gerhardsen therefore proposed in November 1960 that a joint Norwegian–Soviet airport be built on the archipelago. In a cabinet meeting on 15 July 1962, a joint agreement with the United States and the Soviet Union about building an airport was discussed, but no action materialized.

In a cabinet meeting on 5 April 1962, the Minister of Defence Gudmund Harlem proposed that Colonel Gunnar Sverre Pedersen, in lieu of his rank in the military, was to be offered a contract in which he obliged to, for reasons of national security, not to have an ownership in Norsk Polar Navigasjon or conduct any travels or research in Svalbard. If he would not sign, the military would start a process of denying him to travel to the archipelago and to remove him from his job. He was formally asked on 5 May to sell his shares and not travel. Colonel Gunnar Sverre Pedersen responded that he would be loyal to any mandate by the ministry, but reserved the right to take judicial and political evaluation—essentially threatening to take the issue to Parliament. Because of the possible political consequences of the hard line being exposed in the media, Harlem did not receive support from the cabinet to continue the strategy.

In late June and early July, a series of meetings were held between the colonel and the ministry. Colonel Gunnar Sverre Pedersen was informed that his company had complicated the relationship with the Soviet Union and that the government did not want Svalbard to become subject to international tension. Colonel Pedersen promised to cancel his 1962 visit to Svalbard and he would not conduct work which would give the impression that he was working with airport plans. On 27 July, Mayor Jacob Grønning, who had agreed to assist the company in that summer's oil expedition, was instructed to not visit Svalbard either. The travel ban was also applied in 1963 by the military placing a general ban on all travel to Svalbard by officers with a fixed salary.

Colonel Gunnar Sverre Pedersen was permitted to visit Svalbard from 1964 as part of his vacation. In 1965, Borten's Cabinet was instated, which reduced the level of conflict between the Pedersen brothers and the government. The Pedersen brothers stopped working to construct airports. In 1967, an air strip was built in Ny-Ålesund to serve Kongsfjord Telemetry Station and Longyearbyen received an international airport, Svalbard Airport, Longyearbyen, in 1975.
