= Ny-London =

Abandoned mining community in Svalbard

Coordinates: 78.9633°N 12.048°E

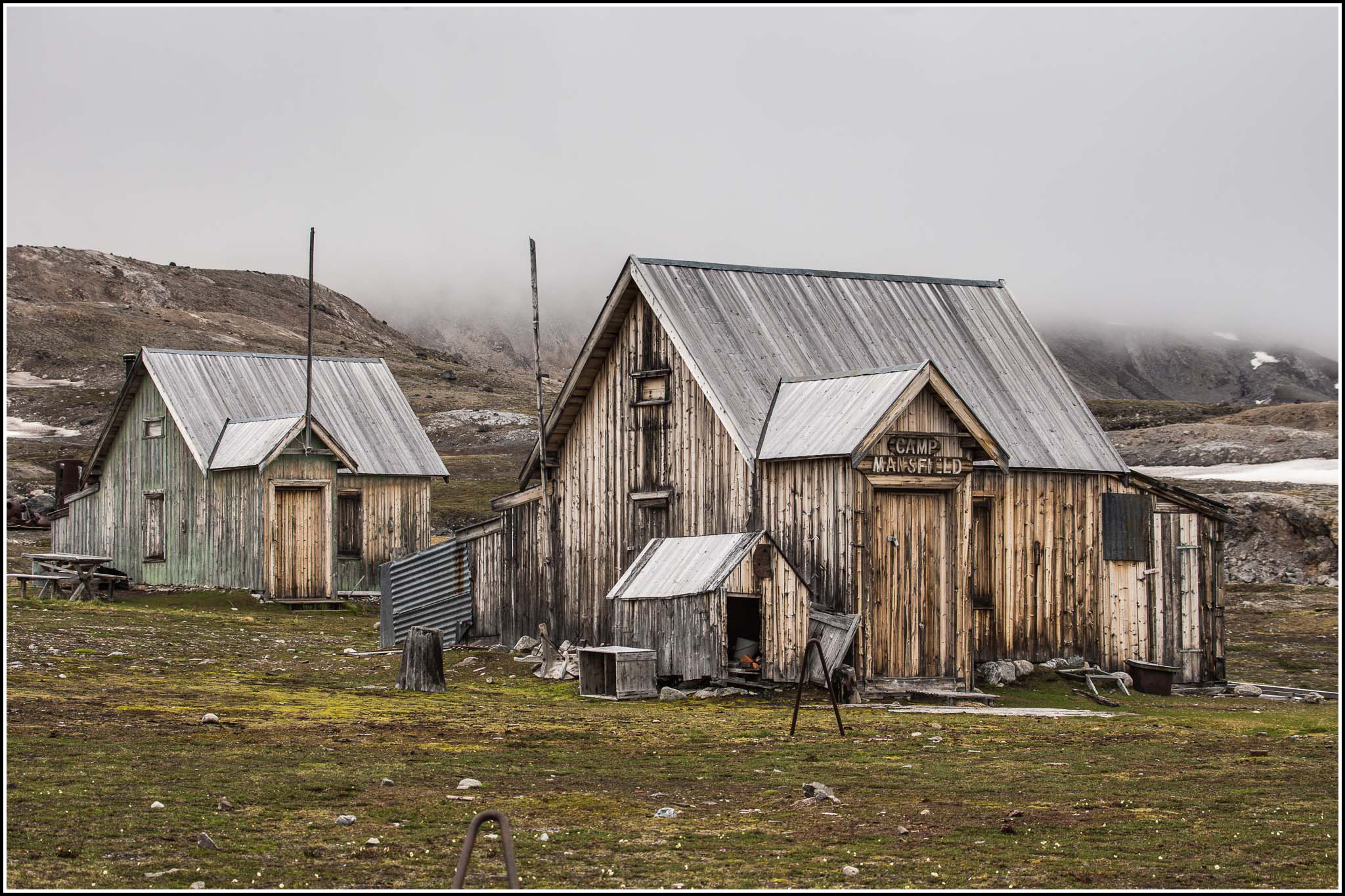
Camp Mansfield, Ny-London.

Ny-London (lit. 'New London') is an abandoned mining settlement on Blomstrandøya, Svalbard, established by the prospector Ernest Mansfield on behalf of the Northern Exploration Company (NEC) in 1911. Mansfield discovered marble on the island in 1906, after which he described the deposits as being "no less than an island of pure marble."

Around 1912, a sizeable amount of the mined marble was shipped to England in order to convince investors. However, the marble turned out to be useless due to the effects of frost weathering, causing it to disintegrate as it reached warmer climates.

All mining operations in the settlement ceased in 1920, after years of little to no activity.
