= Svenskhuset incident =

1872–73 deaths in Svalbard, Norway

Coordinates: 78°28′43.3″N 15°41′47.3″E

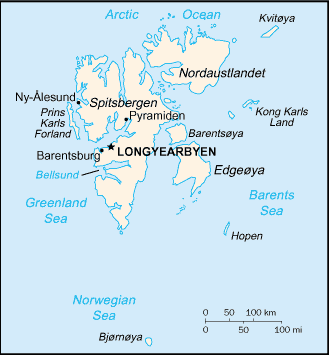
The location of Svenskehuset on Spitsbergen, on the cape south of "Pyramiden".

The Svenskhuset incident was an event in the winter of 1872–73 where seventeen men died in an isolated house on Spitsbergen, Svalbard. The cause of death was long believed to be scurvy, but research done in 2008 has revealed that the men probably suffered lead poisoning. Svenskehuset is today preserved as a cultural heritage site.

== The incident ==
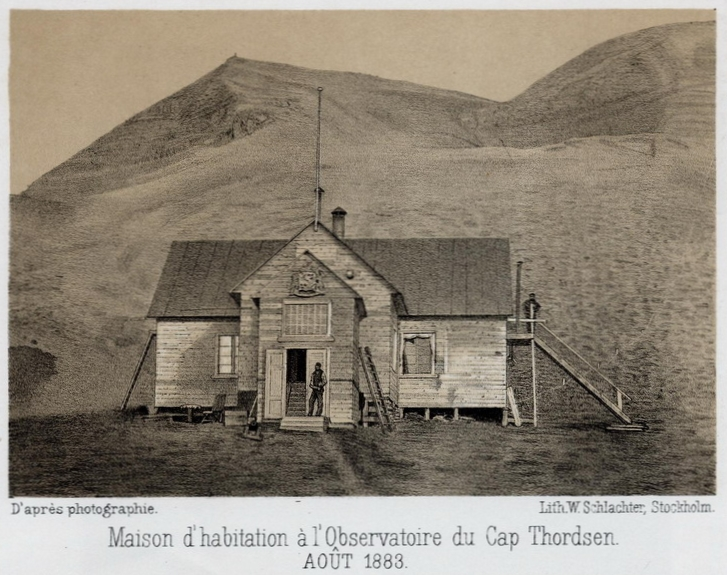
front

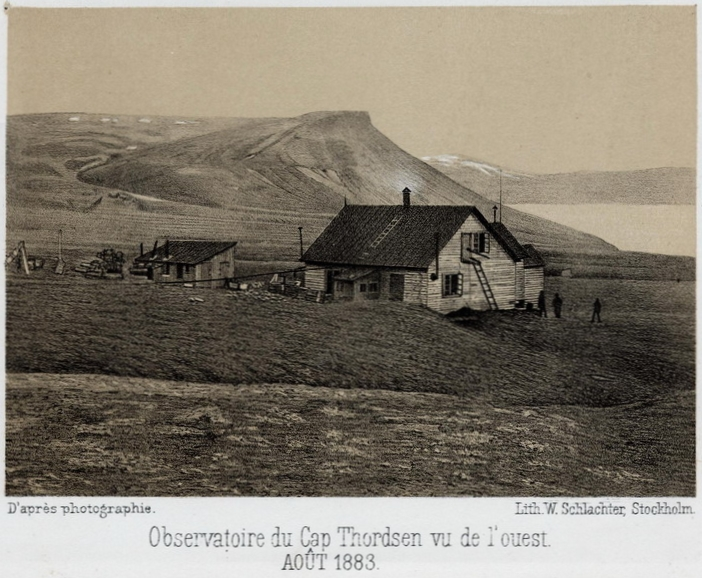
rear

Svenskehuset in 1883

Svenskhuset (the Swedish House) is the oldest house on Spitsbergen. The house was erected by the Swedes on Cape Thordsen in Isfjorden, and was intended to withstand the harsh conditions of the Svalbard winters. A group of Norwegian seal hunters were stuck on the island in the autumn of 1872. They sought out the Finland-Swedish explorer Adolf Erik Nordenskiöld, who at the time was conducting an expedition in the area, for assistance. Nordenskiöld did not have the resources to accommodate all the hunters, so it was agreed that a number of the men would make their way to Svenskhuset, where they knew there would be food, coal and equipment. Seventeen men without families were selected, and on 14 October 1872 they set out for Svenskhuset in row boats. The journey was 350 km (220 mi), and it took the crew seven days to get to their destination.

Next summer a Norwegian ship, led by Fritz Mack from Tromsø, left Norway to rescue the stranded men. Outside the house they found five dead bodies wrapped in a tarpaulin. On the door, which was locked from the inside, there was a sign with a warning not to enter. Inside there were dead bodies scattered in chairs, on beds and on the floor. All together the expedition found fifteen bodies, which were taken out and buried in their beds. Two more bodies were discovered by a group of researchers a few years later. One of the sealers, Karl Albertsen, had kept a diary during his stay in the house. The diary told that a man named Hans Hansen had been the first to die, in November. By Christmas everyone in the house was ill. The last diary entry was written on 19 April. It is assumed that Albertsen was the penultimate man to die.

== 2008 expedition ==
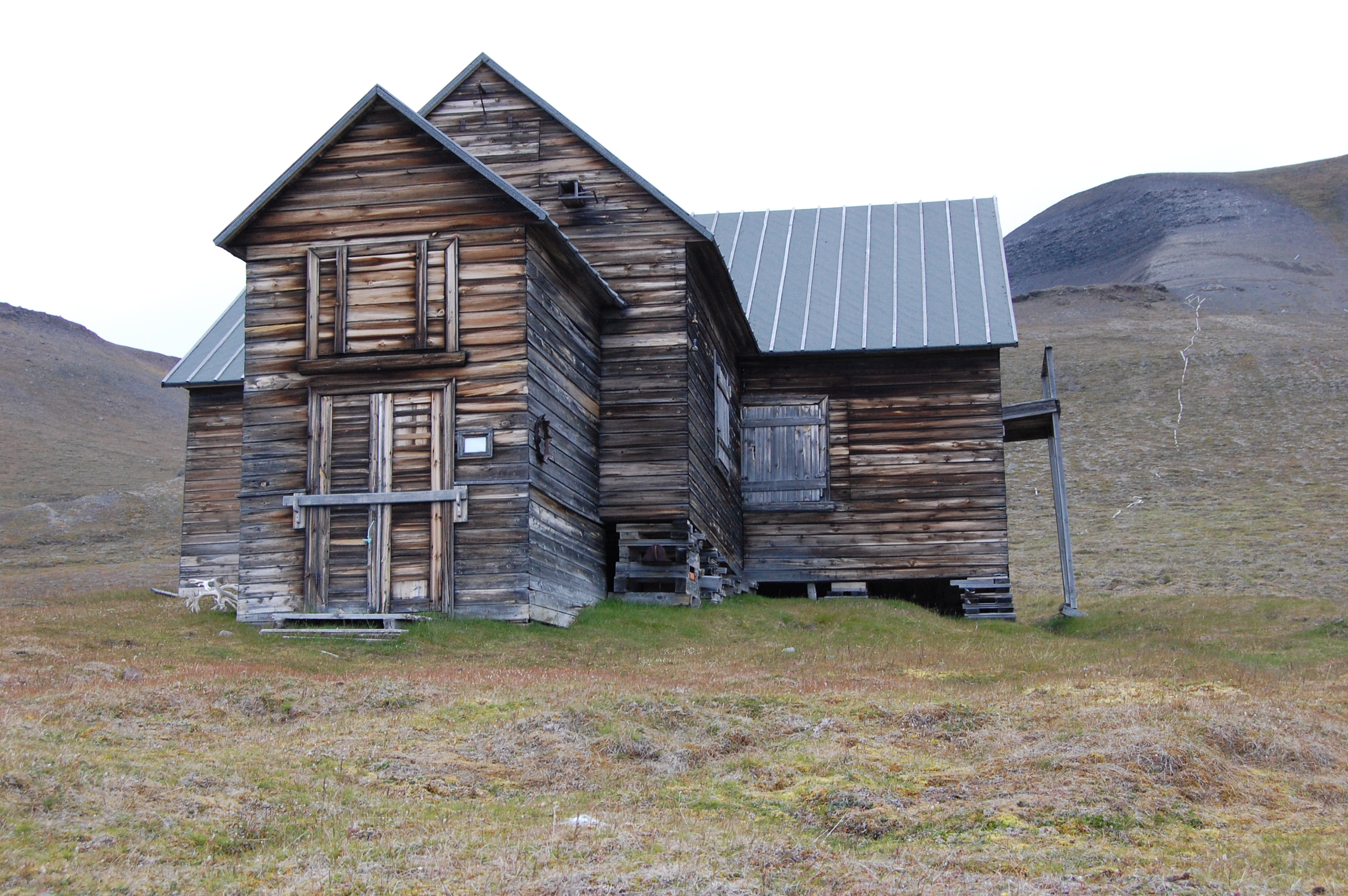
Svenskehuset on Spitsbergen in 2010

A remaining abundance of food and fuel ruled out the possibility that the men might have died from starvation or exposure. It was long believed that the men had died from scurvy; an ailment caused by lack of vitamin C, and common in polar regions. The men were generally berated as ignorant and careless. Some parts of the historical evidence were not consistent with death from scurvy, however. First of all, the men all seemed to have fallen ill at the same time, which would have been peculiar if scurvy had been the cause. Secondly, the diary shows that the group was familiar with the dangers of contracting scurvy, and how to avoid it. Death from tuberculosis, or botulism were other theories.

In 2007, doctor Ulf Aasebø and historian Kjell Kjær applied for permission to open the graves of the victims, to establish cause of death. Their suspicion was that the sealers had in fact died from lead poisoning, not from scurvy. The sealant on tin cans for food in the nineteenth century consisted of as much as fifty percent lead. At first the application was denied by the Norwegian Directorate for Cultural Heritage (Riksantikvaren), but after further elaboration on the scientific purpose and method of the study, permission was granted in July 2008.

The researchers stayed at Cape Thordsen from 7 to 9 August. Some of the graves contained bodies still in their beds, frozen into blocks of ice. These bodies were so well preserved that the expedition refrained from exploring them further. According to Dr. Aasebø these were remains rather than skeletons, and the permission granted, as well as ethical considerations, did not allow samples to be taken from these bodies. Two other bodies were buried in a shallow double grave, and from these skeletons samples were taken. The samples confirmed the theory, as the skeletons showed extremely high concentrations of lead. Furthermore, the tins that had contained the food had inside them "so much lead, that it hung like icicles inside the cans." The findings largely cleared the men of suspicions of negligence; according to Kjær the scientific expedition helped restore their posthumous reputation.

== See also ==
- History of Svalbard
