= Norway–Soviet Union relations =

Norway-Soviet Union relations
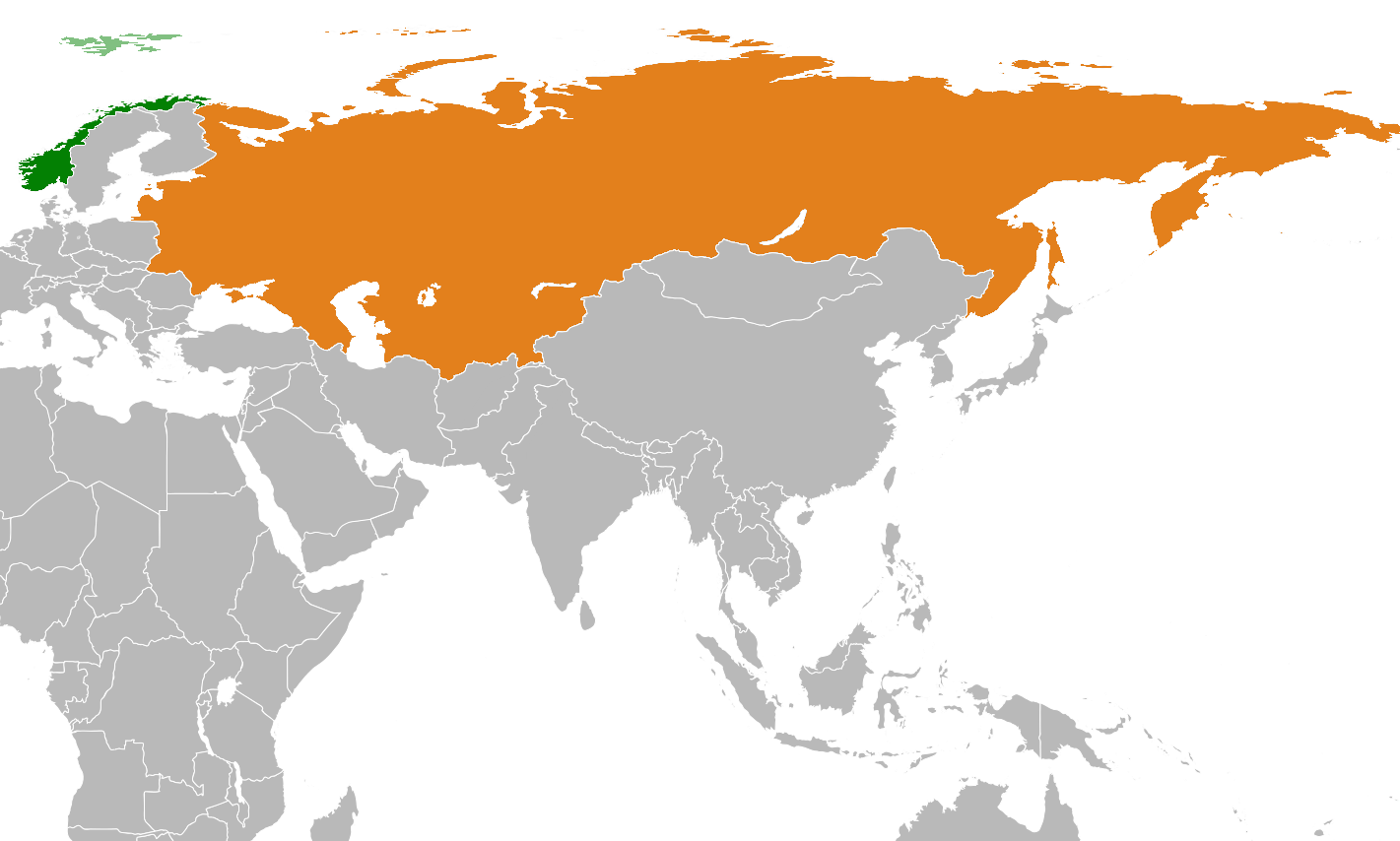

- Norway: Soviet Union

Norway–Soviet Union relations refers to the historical bilateral foreign relations between the two countries, Norway and the Soviet Union, between 1917 and 1991. The establishment of diplomatic relationships between Norway and the Soviet Union dates back to Norway–Russia relations which started on 30 October 1905. The Soviet Union maintained an embassy in Oslo and a consulate in Barentsburg, while Norway maintained an embassy in Moscow.

== Timeline ==
A 2013 article in the Norwegian newspaper Dagbladet said that the autumn of 1951 removal of more than 8,000 Soviet corpses from graves in North Norway, Operation Asphalt, led to "the toughest diplomatic conflict ever between Norway and Soviet".

== Strains in bilateral relations ==
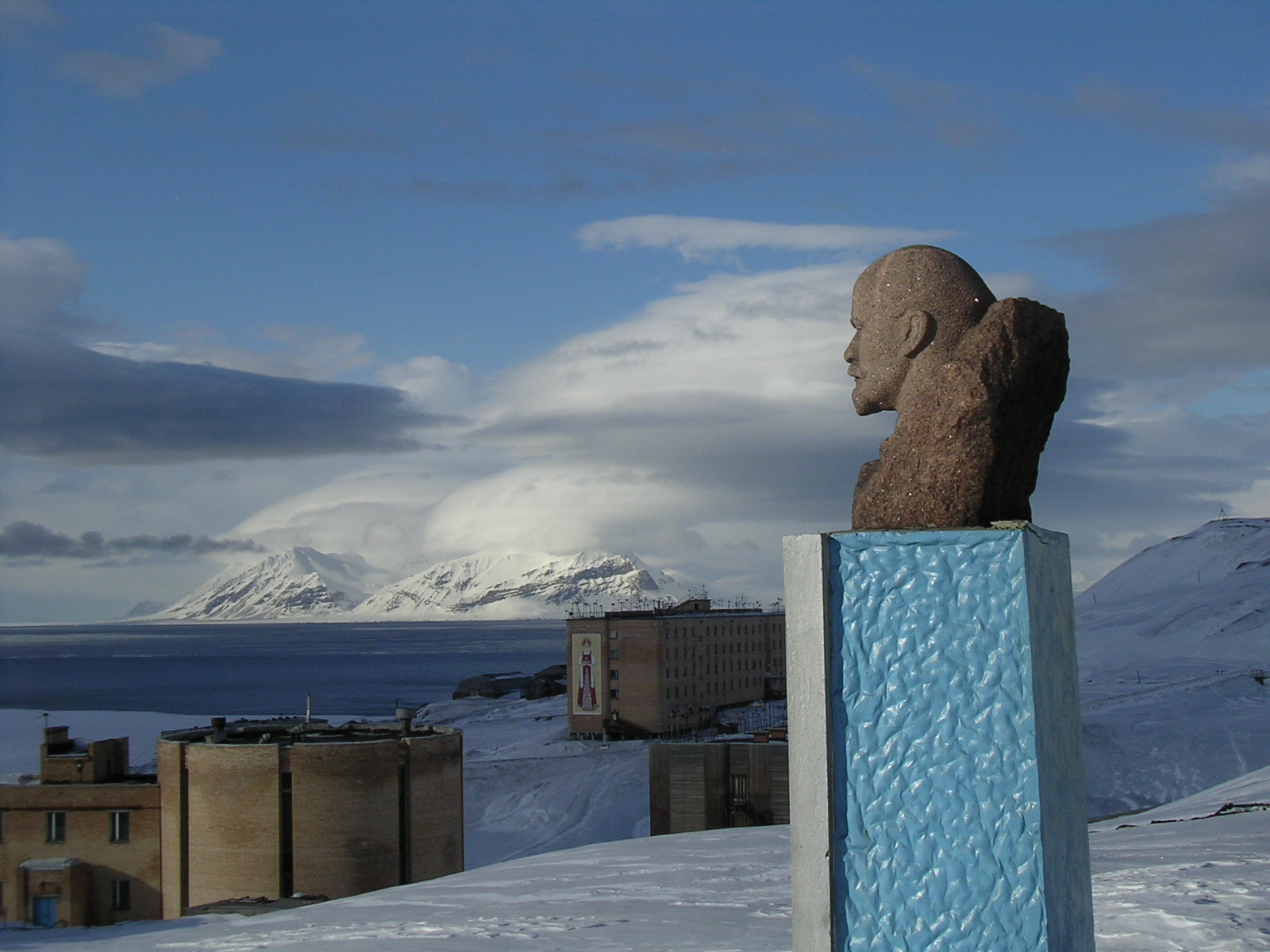
Thanks to the Svalbard Treaty, a state-owned statue of Vladimir Lenin could look over the Russian settlement in Barentsburg in Norway

Both the environmentally devastating emissions from the Norilsk Nickel plant outside Nikel in the Murmansk Oblast and the territorial dispute over the Barents Sea have for decades been unresolved issues in Norway–Soviet, then Norway–Russia relations. On 27 April 2010 Norway and Russia officially resolved the territorial dispute in the Barents Sea. A Soviet border provocation on 7 June 1968, which has been regarded as serious by historians, together with the invasion of Czechoslovakia that year and a general increase in Soviet military activity on the Norwegian border, contributed to a large increase in the funding for the Norwegian military presence on the Norwegian-Soviet border in Finnmark.

Disagreements concerning the interpretation of the Svalbard Treaty, in conjunction with both countries' presence on Svalbard, was a heated political debate during the Cold War. From 1931, the Soviet Union maintained a presence on the archipelago in Barentsburg, Grumant and Pyramiden through the coal-mining company Arktikugol. In 1958, Norsk Polar Navigasjon proposed to build a civilian airport on Svalbard, but this was protested by the Soviet Union. Thus the establishment was stopped by Norwegian authorities. When a government-owned airport was proposed, continued Soviet protests were made, until a bilateral agreement was made permitting Svalbard Airport, Longyear. The Soviet Union also protested Kongsfjord Telemetry Station and the production of the 1985 action film Orion's Belt.

== Border ==
The two countries retained a 195.7-kilometer-long (121.6 mi) land border between Sør-Varanger Municipality and Murmansk Oblast. There was only one legal crossing point, at Storskog (Norway) and Boris Gleb (Russia), on the E105 road about 15 kilometres (9.3 mi) east of the town of Kirkenes.

The border between Norway and the Soviet Union in the Varangerfjord was agreed upon in a treaty from 1957. Negotiations on the outside marine border were initiated in 1970. Norway claimed, in accordance with the United Nations Convention on the Law of the Sea Article 15 and the Convention on the High Seas, that the border should follow the midline principle, the border being defined by midpoints between the nearest land area or islands, as is normal practice internationally. The Soviet Union claimed, based on a decision by Joseph Stalin from 1926, which was not recognized by any other country than the Soviet Union, that the "sector principle" should apply, such that the border should follow meridian lines. Most of the disputed area was within what would normally be considered Norwegian according to the relevant international treaties. In 1975 the two countries agreed upon a moratorium prohibiting exploration for oil and gas in the disputed area.

In 1978 a temporary agreement, known as the Grey Zone Agreement, regulating fishery in a 60,000 km^{2} (23,000 sq mi) zone, named the Grey Zone (Norwegian: Gråsonen) in some documents from the same time, was signed, which has since been renewed annually. From the Norwegian side, the agreement was negotiated by Labour politician Jens Evensen and his protégé Arne Treholt, who was later exposed as a Soviet spy and convicted of treason. The agreement was highly controversial in Norway. Many Norwegians believed that Evensen and Treholt gave too many concessions to the Soviet Union, and that they were motivated by Soviet sympathies. The agreement caused consternation in parliament and government, and Evensen had difficulty getting it accepted by his own government, where many held the opinion that he had exceeded his authority. The opposition parties criticized Evensen for using the term Grey Zone, because it implied that Norway did not maintain its claim on rightful Norwegian territory in their opinion. In an interview with Danmarks Radio in 1990, Treholt, who was then serving a 20-year sentence, admitted that he had acted as an informer for the Soviet negotiators. The arrest and conviction of Treholt in 1984–1985 had a devastating effect on Evensen, who withdrew completely from public life in Norway.

== See also ==
- Foreign relations of Norway
- Foreign relations of the Soviet Union
- Norway–Russia relations
