= Sholto Douglas, 19th Earl of Morton =

Sholto George Watson Douglas, 19th Earl of Morton, DL (5 November 1844 – 8 October 1935) was a major landowner in Scotland, a businessman with mining investments in what is now Svalbard, Norway, and a politician, serving as a Scottish representative peer (1886–1935) after being elected by the Peerage of Scotland.

== Biography ==
In the early 20th century, entrepreneurs and national governments staked claims in the Arctic archipelago of Svalbard, to develop resources through mining. Britain, the Netherlands, and Denmark-Norway all had interests there, and were soon followed by the Russian Empire.

The Earl of Morton had several Arctic interests. He and Alexander Bruce Hugh, 6th Lord Balfour of Burleigh, held major shares in the little-known Spitzbergen Coal and Mineral Ltd of London. In 1906, Morton became involved, with his son Rory, in the Spitzbergen Mining and Exploration Syndicate (SMES). Together with other major investors, they claimed land on the island of Spitsbergen, now Svalbard, Norway, and, that year, opened a coal mine at Camp Morton. He and his sons Rory, Charley, Ronald, and William sailed to Norway and Spitsbergen from May to July 1906 abroad on the SY Latona. The company was renamed Northern Enterprise Company Ltd (NEC) in 1910. Coal was mined there into the mid-1920s. NEC sold the properties to the Norwegian government in 1932.

Douglas was elected by the Peerage of Scotland as a Scottish representative peer to the House of Lords in 1886, serving in that position until his death on 8 October 1935. He was a landowner and resident of Conaglen House in Ardgour, Argyllshire. He served as a Deputy Lieutenant for the County of Argyll beginning in May 1901.

He married the Hon. Helen Geraldine Ponsonby, youngest daughter of Charles Ponsonby, 2nd Baron de Mauley. His eldest son, Sholto Charles, Lord Aberdour, predeceased his father on 29 September 1911. The Morton honours passed to the 19th Earl's grandson, Sholto Charles John Hay Douglas (1907–1976).

Peerage of Scotland
Preceded by Sholto Douglas	Earl of Morton; 1884–1935	Succeeded by Sholto Douglas
