= Russians in Norway =

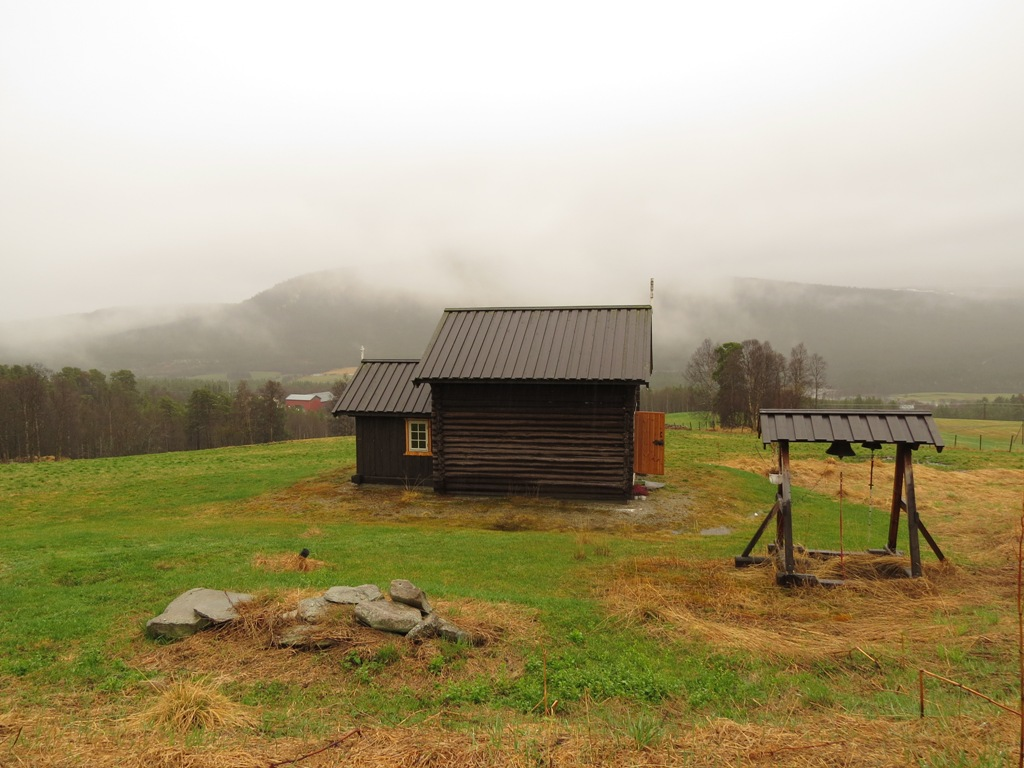
- A Russian Orthodox chapel at Stiklestad, Norway

Total population
- 21,504 (2019 Official Norway estimate) 0.40% of the Norwegian population

Regions with significant populations
- Oslo, Sør-Varanger, Barentsburg

Languages
- Norwegian, Russian, Chechen, Tatar, Sami

Related ethnic groups
- Russian diaspora, Chechen diaspora

Russians in Norway are people born in Russia or whose parents were both born in Russia and who live in Norway.

== Demographics ==
As of 1 January 2012 there were 16,833 Russians in Norway, of whom 14,953 were first generation immigrants while 1,880 were Norwegian-born descendants. In 2019 the number have risen to 21,504, and Russians make up 0.40% of the Norwegian population, and 2.28% of all foreign residents in Norway are Russians.

In the only municipality that borders Russia, Sør-Varanger, there are 420 Russians. They make up 4.14% of the population, and 24.93% of all foreign residents in the municipality.

Around one fifth of Russians in Norway lives in Oslo. 4,137 Russians lives in Oslo, but fewer than 1,000 in other cities such as Bergen, Trondheim, and Stavanger.

Around one-third of Russians in Norway have refugee background mostly from Chechnya.

== Crime ==
According to Statistics Norway, in the 2010-2013 period, the proportion of Russian-born perpetrators of criminal offences aged 15 and older in Norway was 79.4 per 1000 residents. When corrected for variables such as age and gender as well as employment, the total decreased to 76.1 after age and gender adjustment. This is higher compared to the averages of 44.9 among native Norwegians. Compared to other migration groups from Eastern Europe, Russians had a lower proportion of perpetrators of criminal offences then migrants from Kosovo (131.5 and 113.0 after age and gender adjustment) and migrants from Lithuania (95.6 and 72.8 after age and gender adjustment). But it was higher than migrants from Bosnia and Herzegovina (59.9 and 54.6 after age and gender adjustment) and migrants from Poland (66.2 and 46.2 after age and gender adjustment).

== Marriage ==
Many Russian women have come to Norway to marry Norwegian men with no immigrant background. The Norwegian-Russians are one of the immigrant groups with the highest proportion of women, a total of 67% women; only Norwegian-Filipinos have a higher proportion of women. Russian men in Norway largely marry Russian women in Norway (75%, or 681 out of 912 marriages in 2007), while Russian women in Norway marry Norwegian men without immigrant background (69%, or 2,253 out of 3,259 marriages in 2007).

== Education and Employment ==
47% of Russians in Norway have a higher education.

Russian women have an employment rate of approximately 51%. Russian men have an employment rate of approximately 45%. This makes Russians the only immigrant group in Norway in which more women are employed than men.

== See also ==
- Barentsburg
- Norway–Russia relations
- Russians in Finland
- Russians in Sweden
