= Norway–Russia relations =

- Norway: Russia

Diplomatic mission
- Norwegian embassy, Moscow: Russian embassy, Oslo

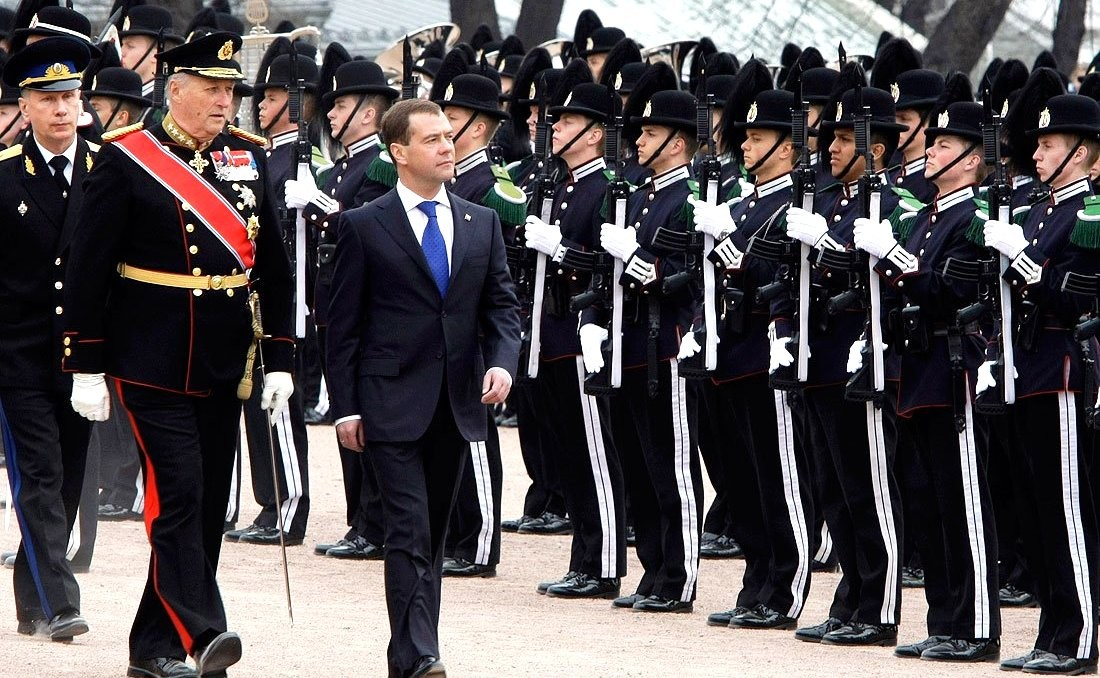
Dmitry Medvedev at an official greeting ceremony in Norway with Harald V of Norway

Norway–Russia relations are the bilateral relations between the Kingdom of Norway and the Russian Federation. Diplomatic relations between the two nations were established on 30 October 1905 – four days after the establishment of Norway's independence. Russia has an embassy in Oslo, as well as consulates in Barentsburg and Kirkenes; likewise, Norway has an embassy in Moscow, as well as consulates in Murmansk and Saint Petersburg. The countries border each other along a 195.7 km (121.6 mi) long border. Norway is on Russia's Unfriendly Countries List.

== Timeline ==
=== Early history ===
In the 10th century, Norwegian Vikings had sporadic contact with the inhabitants of Bjarmaland, a region that today corresponds to the shores of the White Sea in Russia. In the 13th century, the Norwegians conducted trading expeditions to the Northern Dvina and they would sometimes reach the Russian interior. A 1267 law code refers to the Norwegians' commercial expeditions.

Conflict between the Norwegians and the Russian city-state of Novgorod over competing interests led to the signing of the Treaty of Novgorod in 1326, which reaffirmed the status quo and maintained free trade. Although a border was not formally delineated, a buffer zone was created and some regions were placed under joint administration.

The Norwegians built the fortress of Vardøhus in 1300 near the modern border while the main economic center on the Russian side was the Solovetsky Monastery. The Norwegians may have settled the Kola Peninsula and they would continue to claim control over the region. The Russian word murmansky, which refers to the northern coast in the region, is derived from an old name for the Norwegians, nordmann. The first Russian town in the region was founded in 1583 near the current site of Arkhangelsk and had a Norwegian guest house.

=== 1537–1814 ===
Denmark handled the foreign relations of Norway during this period. Denmark and Russia were in general allies against their mutual enemy Sweden.

=== 1814–1905 ===
Sweden handled the foreign relations of Norway during this period. The Norway–Russia border was defined in 1826.

=== After 1991 ===
On 27 April 2010, Norway and Russia officially resolved the territorial dispute in the Barents Sea.

In May 2012, Akhmed Zakayev, Prime Minister of the Ichkerian government-in-exile, attended the Oslo Freedom Forum, leading to formal complaints by Russia.

In July 2020, Norway expelled a Russian diplomat on suspicion of espionage.

After Russia invaded Ukraine in February 2022, Norway imposed sanctions on Russia. Later on 6 April 2022, Norway declared three Russian diplomats persona non grata, and expelled them from the country. Russia expelled three Norwegian diplomats later that month. Except for fishing boats who may still dock in Båtsfjord, Kirkenes and Tromsø, all Russian ships were also banned by Norway from entering Norwegian ports. The border between the two countries remains open, but crossing is only allowed via Borisoglebsk/Storskog.

In October 2022, the Norwegian Police Security Service arrested Mikhail Mikushin, a Russian national posing as a Brazilian with the name of José Assis Giammaria, and charged him with gathering intelligence on state secrets on behalf of Russia. Mikushin was exchanged back to Russia during a prisoner exchange in August 2024.

In April 2023 Norway expelled 15 Russian diplomats on suspicion of spying. Russia promptly responded by expelling 10 Norwegian diplomats and in August added Norway to its list of unfriendly countries.

In September 2026, the Norwegian government acted on a Norwegian court's order, that resulted in Russian ship Professor Molchanov being arrested at Svalbard, Norway; the Ukrainian company Naftogaz is owed money by Russia. On 3 September, Norway's ambassador was called in to Russia's foreign ministry; he explained that an arbitration from 2023 in Hague, is the basis of the situation; furthermore he said the parties are one private party in addition to Russia.

== Strains in bilateral relations ==
The environmentally harmful emissions from the Norilsk Nickel plant outside Nikel in the Murmansk Oblast have been for decades an unresolved issue in then Norwegian–Soviet, and now Norwegian–Russian relations.

Formerly there was a territorial dispute over the Barents Sea, but on 27 April 2010, Norway and Russia officially resolved the territorial debate.

A 2017 Kremlin maritime threat assessment which was sent to President Vladimir Putin highlighted Norway as a perceived threat and therefore a potential cause of naval conflict.

In December 2017, Frode Berg, a Norwegian citizen, was arrested in Russia on allegations of having operated a spy ring in the country since 2015, and was detained at Lefortovo Prison. In 2017, hackers believed to be Russians targeted the Labour Party.

There has long been tension over the GLOBUS radar installation in Vardø, which Russian officials believe to be part of a United States missile defense system. Two mock airstrikes involving Russian fighter jets and bombers were executed against the town in 2017 and 2018, each time pulling short of violating Norwegian airspace, and in 2019 a Bal coastal missile system was deployed 70 km from the radar system, just 35 km from the Norwegian-Russian land border.

Norway is strongly against the Russian invasion of Ukraine, and is among the leading countries in terms of military, humanitary and economic support to Ukraine. Norway has instigated a long series of economic sanctions against Russia, including adhering to most of the sanctions from the European Union against Russia.

== In popular culture ==
The 2015 fictional political thriller TV series Occupied is based on a hypothetical strain in relations between the two countries after Norway ceases fossil fuel production in response to a climate crisis. It is available on Netflix in many countries.

In response to the TV series, the Vyacheslav Pavlovsky, the Russian ambassador to Norway, told Russian News Agency TASS,

It is certainly a shame that, in the year of the 70th anniversary of the victory in World War II, the authors have seemingly forgotten the Soviet Army's heroic contribution to the liberation of northern Norway from Nazi occupiers, decided, in the worst traditions of the Cold War, to scare Norwegian spectators with the nonexistent threat from the east.

The Russian embassy had been informed in an early stage of the work on the series.

== Gallery ==
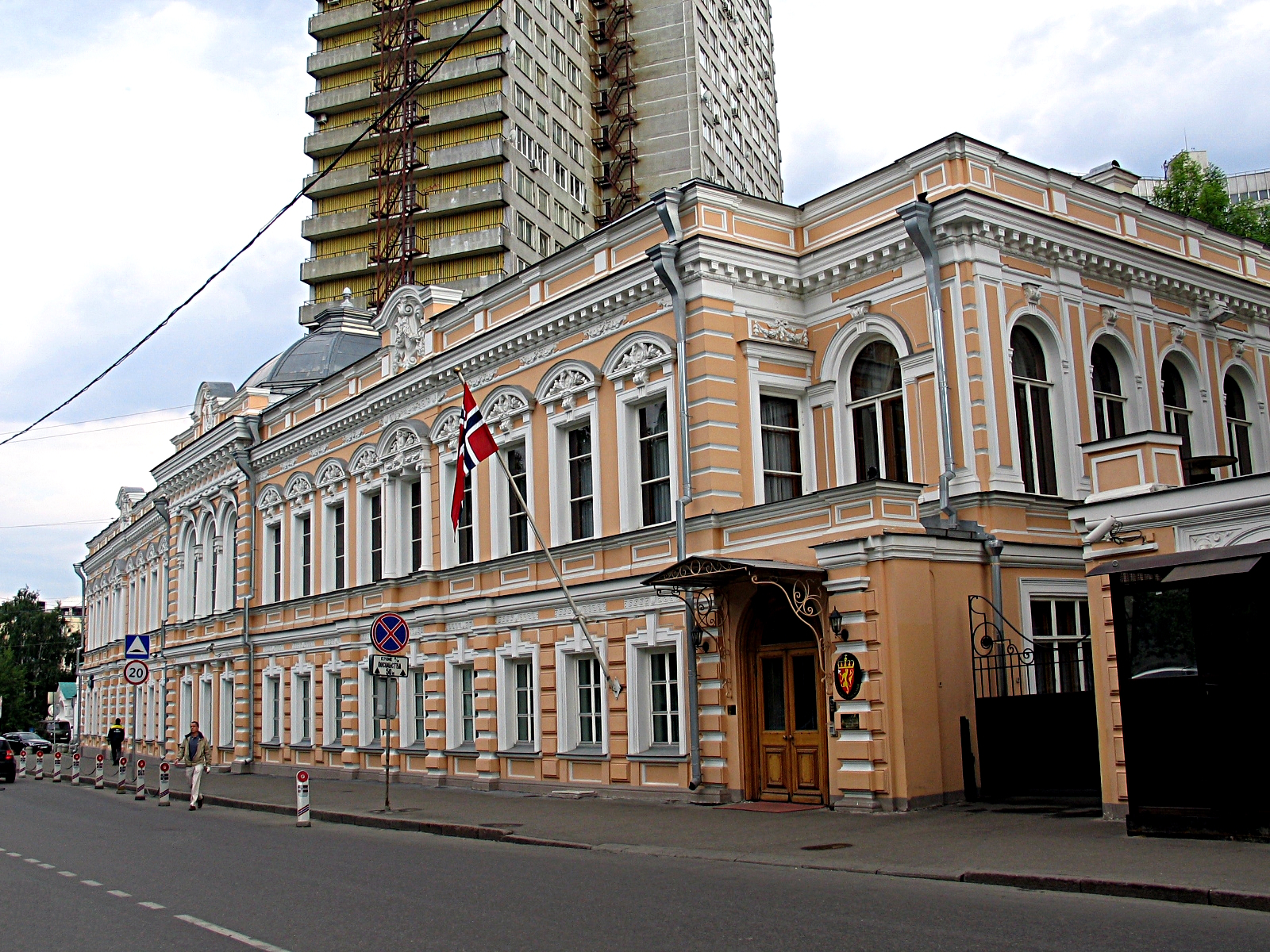
Norwegian embassy in Moscow, Russia

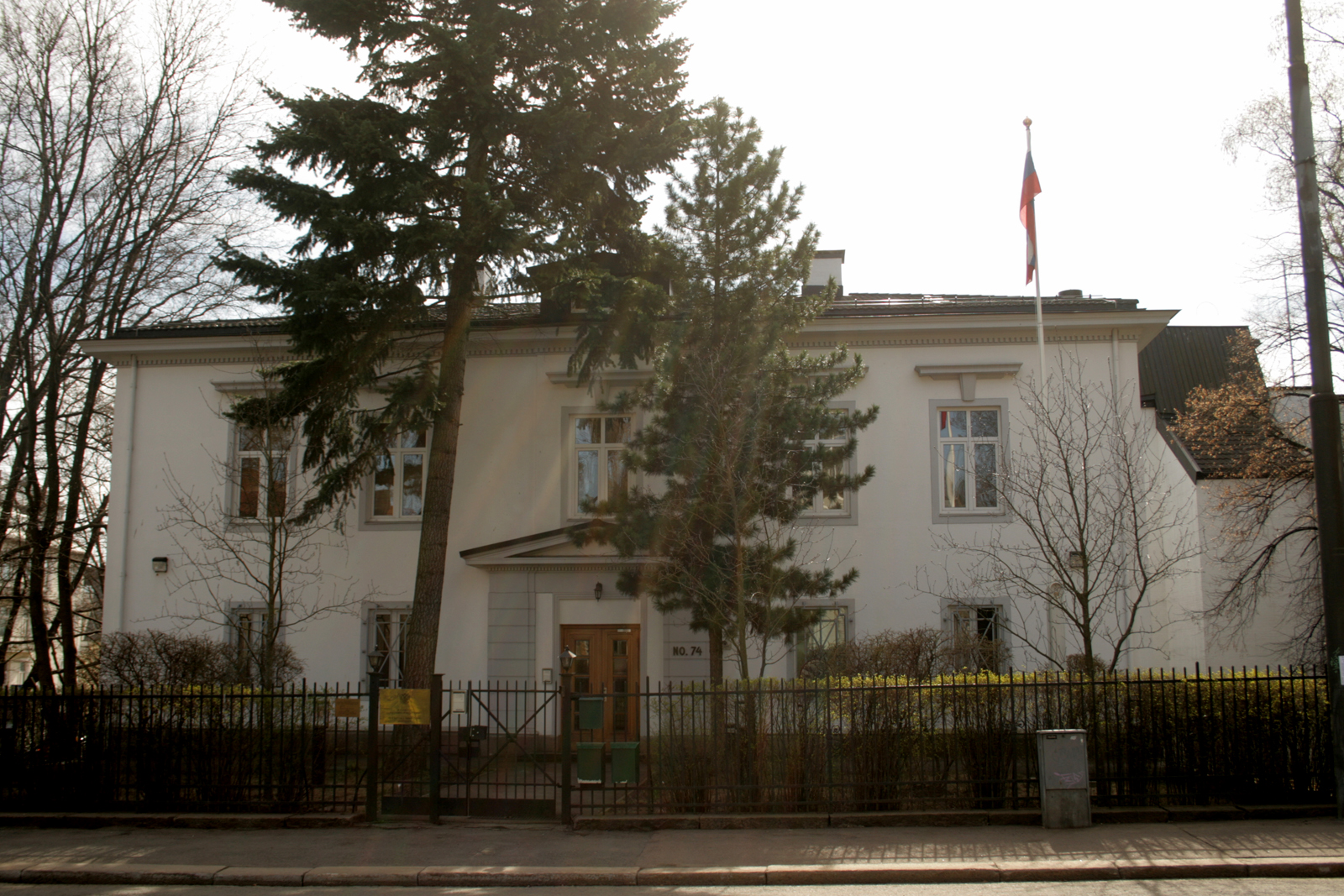
Russian embassy in Oslo, Norway

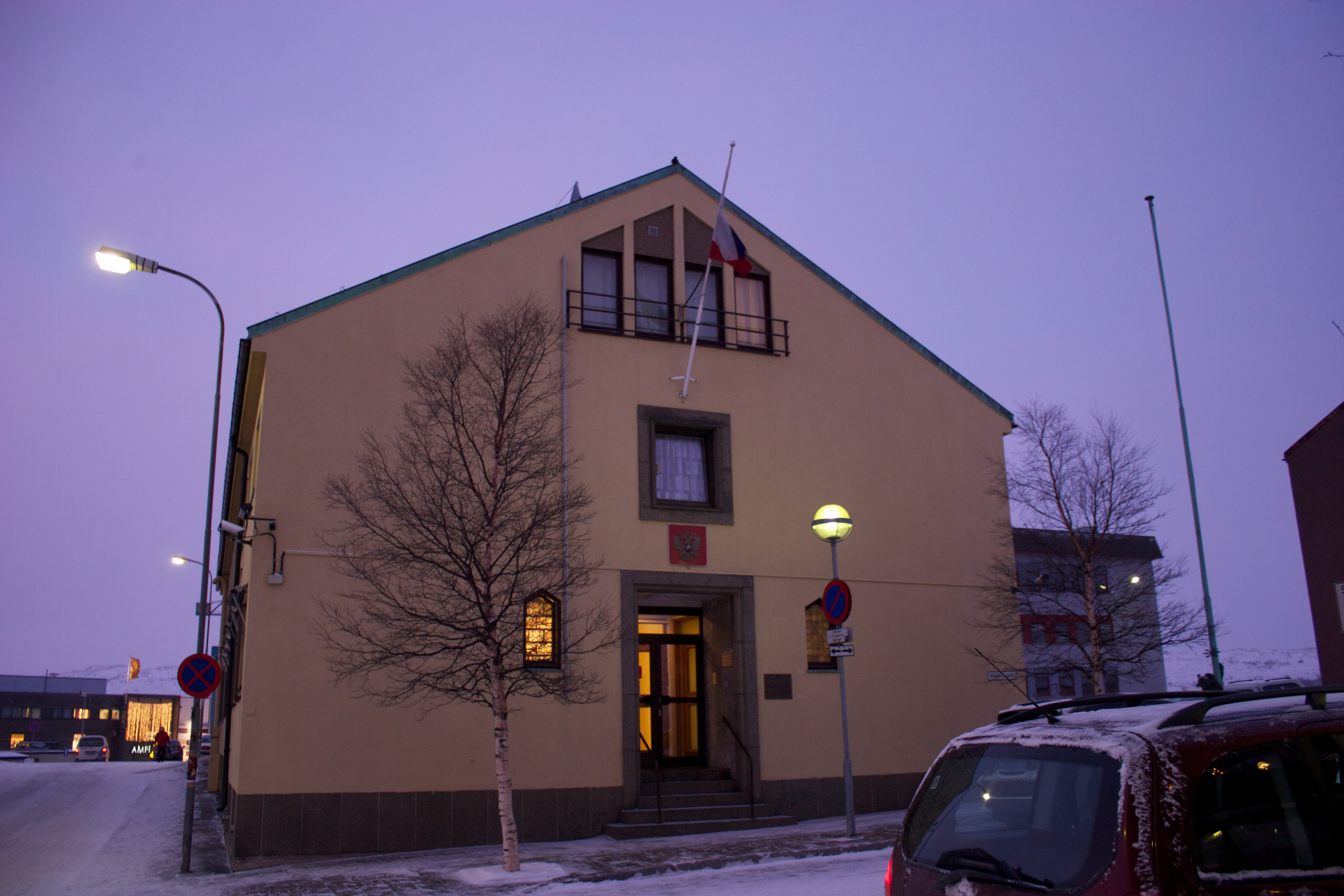
Russian consulate-general in Kirkenes, Norway

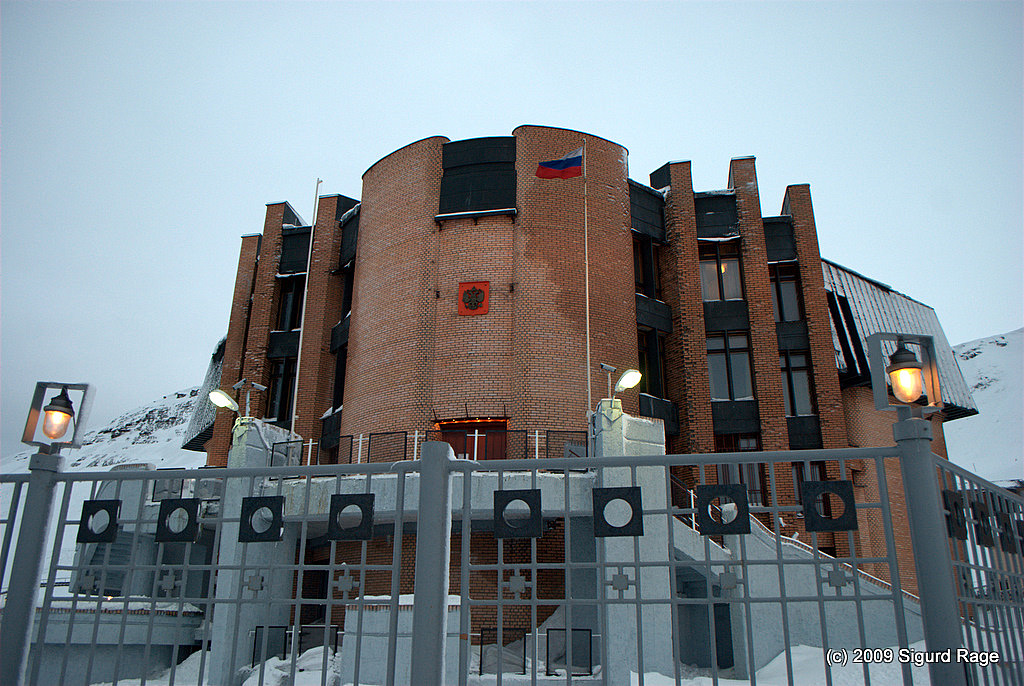
Russian consulate-general in Barentsburg, Norway

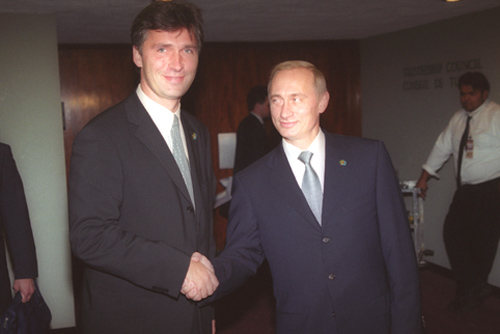
Russian President Vladimir Putin with Norwegian Prime Minister Jens Stoltenberg in New York City, 2000

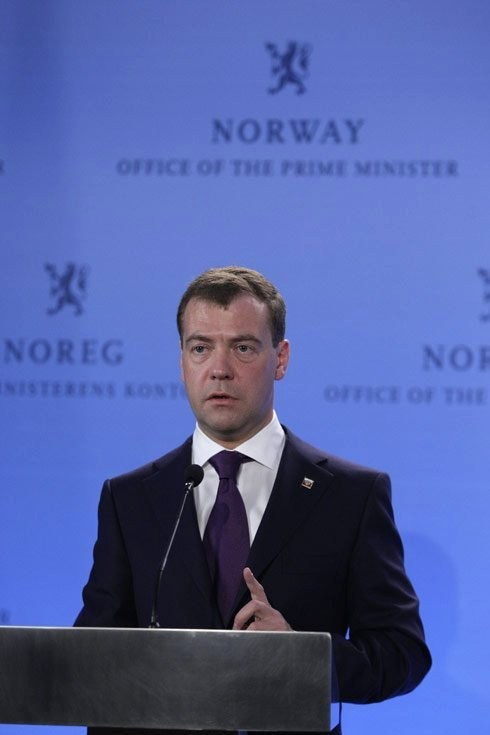
Dmitry Medvedev speak at a joint press conference with Norwegian Prime Minister Jens Stoltenberg

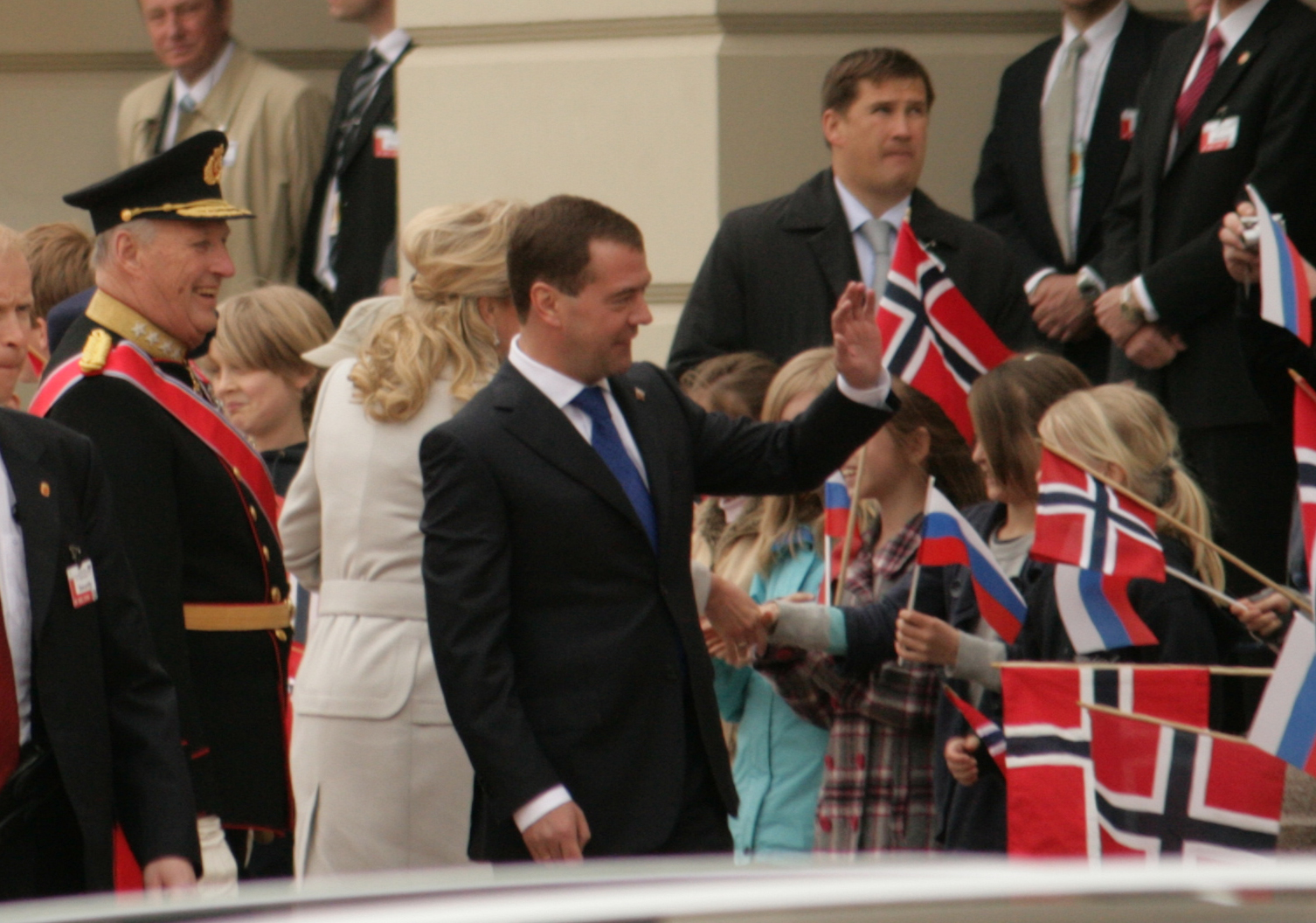
Dmitry Medvedev and Harald V of Norway greeting children outside the Royal Palace, Oslo

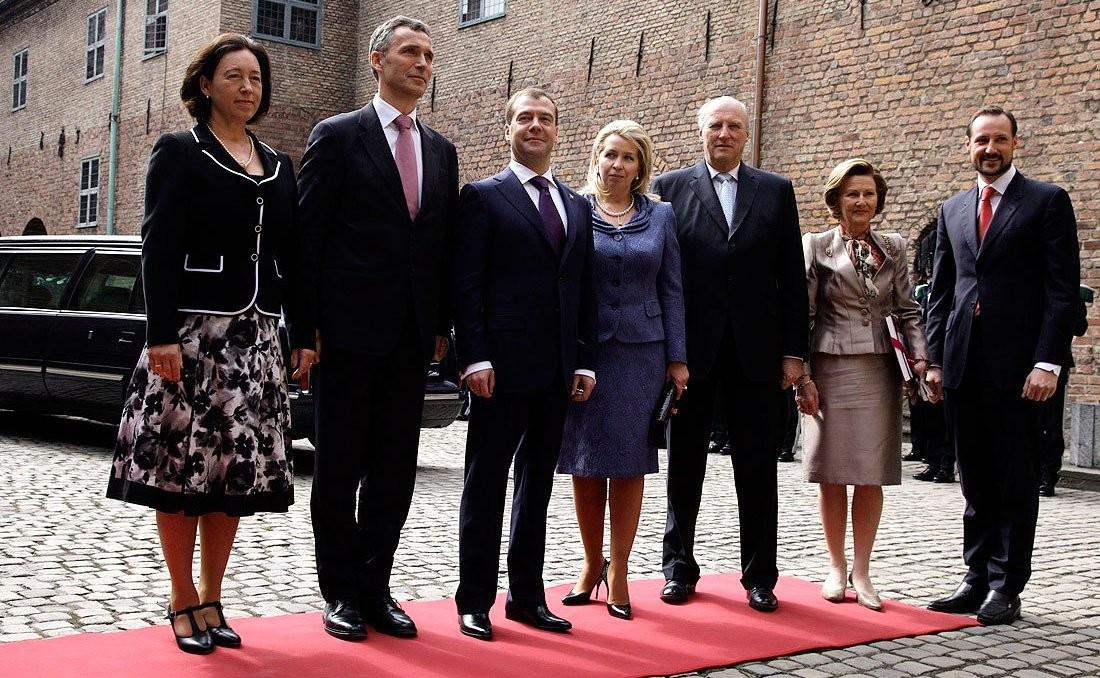
Dmitry Medvedev and Jens Stoltenberg with Ingrid Schulerud, Svetlana Medvedeva, Harald V of Norway, Queen Sonja of Norway and Haakon, Crown Prince of Norway outside Akershus Fortress in Oslo, Norway

== See also ==
- Norway–Soviet Union relations
- Norway–Russia border
- Pomor trade
- List of ambassadors of Russia to Norway
- Russians in Norway

== Literature ==
- Kotilaine, Jarmo T. (2004). "Norway, Relations with". Encyclopedia of Russian History. Macmillan Reference USA. pp. 1067–1068. ISBN 978-0-02-865907-7.
- Соседи на Крайнем Севере: Россия и Норвегия: От первых контактов до Баренцева сотрудничества. Учебное пособие / Под ред. Т. Т. Фёдоровой. — Мурманск: Мурманское книжное издательство, 2001. — 384 с. — 1000 экз. — ISBN 5-85510-241-6
