= Ernest Mansfield =

English entrepreneur (1862–1924)

Ernest Richard Mansfield
- Born: 1862; London, England
- Died: 1924 (aged 61–62); Leeds, England
- Occupation: entrepreneur

Ernest Richard Mansfield (1862–1924) was an English entrepreneur and prospector.

== Career ==
Between 1905 and 1913, he led expeditions to Svalbard, where he annexed large areas for the purpose of extracting minerals. The rights to these areas were purchased by the Northern Exploration Company (NEC) in 1911, paid out as shares, in return for his commitment to work for the company for the next five years.

A number of camps and stations were established during this period, all of which have since been abandoned. These can be found in various states of decay along the west coast of Spitsbergen.

On behalf of the Northern Exploration Company, he founded the mining settlement of Ny-London on the island of Blomstrandøya in 1911, after discovering marble deposits on the island.
