= Blomstrandhalvøya =

Island in Svalbard, Norway

Coordinates: 78.9778°N 12.0773°E

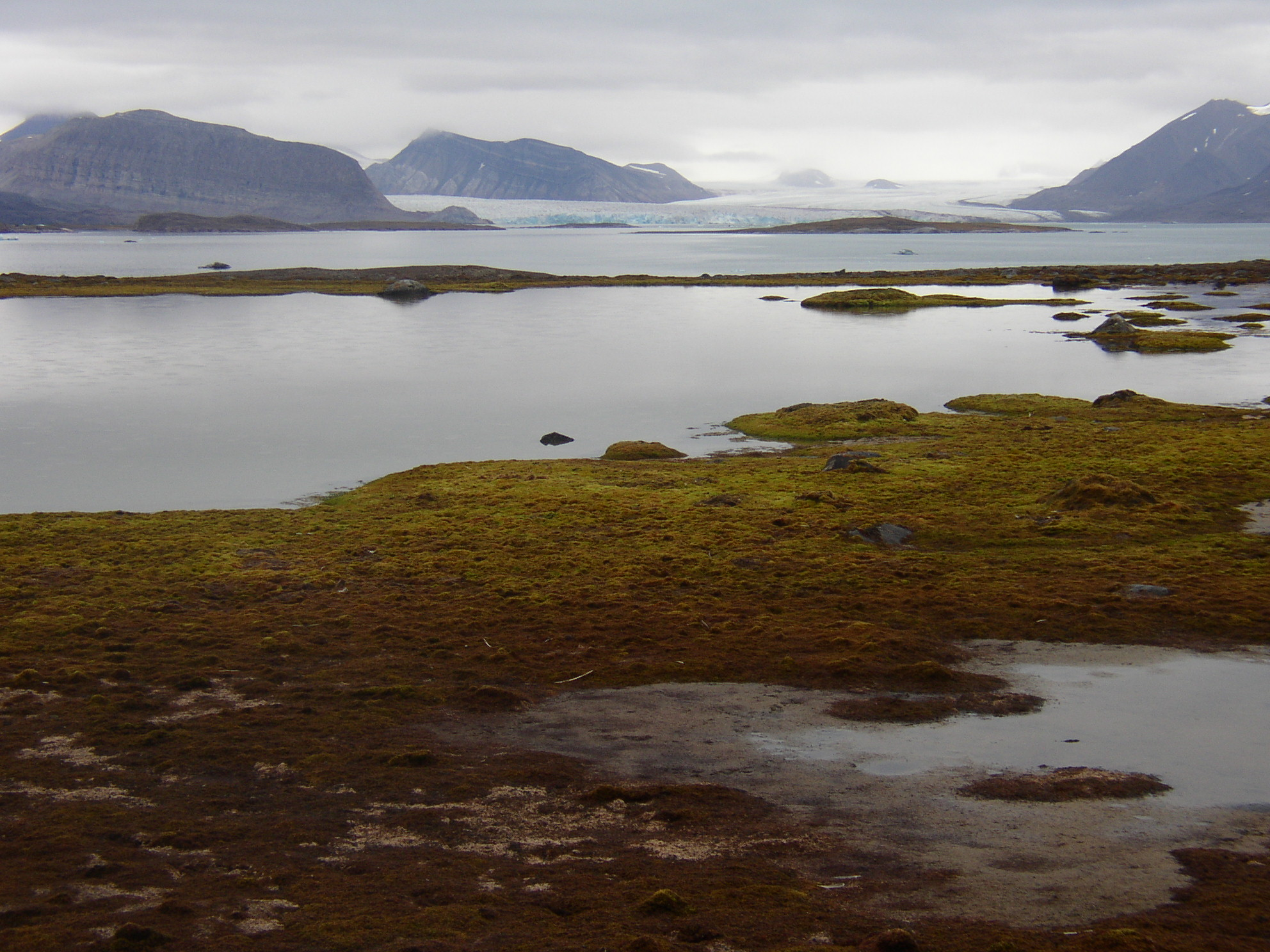
View of Kongsfjorden from Blomstrandøya.

Blomstrandøya (lit. 'The Blomstrand Island'), also known as Blomstrandhalvøya, is an island at the western side of Spitsbergen, Svalbard. It is located in Kongsfjorden, near the northern side of the fjord, and has a roughly circular shape with a cross section of about 5 km. The island was originally believed to be a peninsula, when the glacier Blomstrandbreen extended onto the island. The highest mountain is Irgensfjellet 385 m.a.s.l. The former peninsula has an area of 16,4 km^{2}.

In 1911, the English prospector Ernest Mansfield founded Ny-London, a now derelict marble mining settlement which lies on the southwestern part of the island.
