= Fuglehuken =

Headland of Prins Karls Forland, Svalbard

Coordinates: 78°53′47″N 10°28′03″E

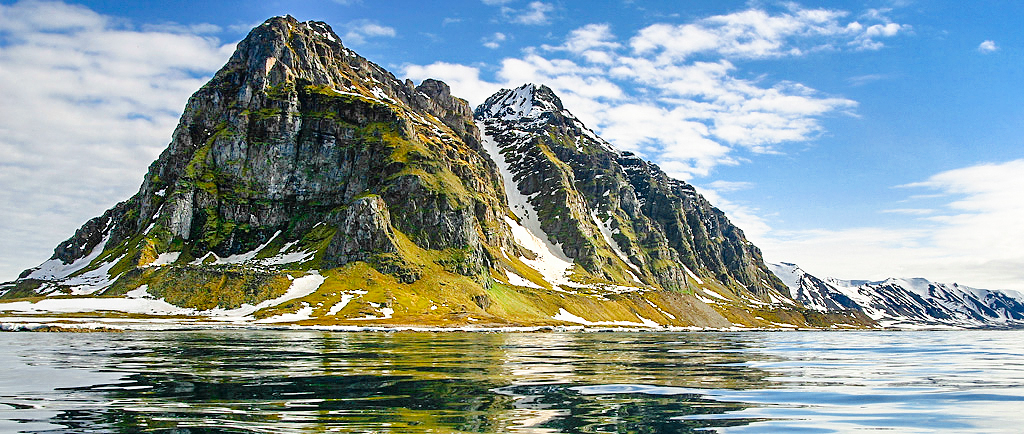
Fuglehuken, the northern point of Prins Karls Forland.

Fuglehuken (English: bird hook) is a headland at the northern end of Prins Karls Forland, Svalbard. The headland includes the mountain Fuglehukfjellet (583 meters). A radio beacon was installed at Fuglehuken in 1946.
