= Camp Morton, Svalbard =

Coal mining encampment in Norway

Coordinates: 77.48°N 14.58°E

Camp Morton (also known as Camp Douglas) was a coal mining encampment on Spitsbergen island in the Svalbard archipelago, Norway. It was located on the northern shores of Van Mijenfjorden, near the sea entrance. It was part of an effort by British investors and entrepreneurs to extract resources from Spitsbergen, at that time open to various nations' claims for development.

Located above the Arctic Circle, the camp was set up in the early 20th century by Ernest Mansfield, a prospector staking claims on behalf of a British investment company set up to mine for resources on the island. A major backer of the Spitzbergen Mining and Exploration Syndicate (SMES) was Sholto Douglas, 19th Earl of Morton, and the camp was named for him. The company in 1910 was renamed as Northern Exploration Company Ltd (NEC). The coal mine operated from 1906 into the mid-1920s. About half of the huts owned by NEC remain; the major building, now called Camp Morton, has been restored by the Norwegian government.

== History ==
In the early 20th century, Spitsbergen, in the archipelago now known as Svalbard, became a site for resource extraction and development north of the coast of Norway, then under Danish rule. Several nations had staked opposing claims there in the late 19th century, including the Dutch, Danish and British. Investors set up companies to develop the resources there, always with the hopes of a rich strike of gold, as had occurred with the Klondike Gold Rush in Yukon, Canada in the late 1890s. One of the British companies was Spitzbergen Coal and Mineral Ltd of London, one of whose major investors was Sholto Douglas, 19th Earl of Morton. It evolved into the Spitzbergen Mining and Exploration Syndicate in 1905. The company in 1910 was renamed as Northern Exploration Company Ltd.

Ernest Mansfield, a British prospector and entrepreneur who was a "pioneer of the 'Klondike period' in Svalbard," was active on behalf of the British NEC in Spitsbergen, laying claim to land especially on the west coast of the island. (The claims are in the names of major investors.) He built camps to try to mark and protect the land claims, hiring trappers to look after them during the winter months.

In 1901 Ivar Stenehjem, a merchant, got funding for a couple of expeditions to Spitsbergen with the help of ship-owner Christian Michelsen from Bergen. In 1905 Michelsen became Norway’s first prime minister. Stenehjem built a large timber building at Camp Morton called Michelsenhuset in his honor.

The NEC coal mine at Camp Morton opened in 1906 and operated until 1920. Numerous camp buildings were constructed with funding from the Northern Exploration Company. Some were named after investors and their family members, such as Camp Mansfield and Camp Zoe (after Mansfield’s daughter). Camp Morton was named after Sholto Douglas, the Earl of Morton.

The coal mining was never as profitable as investors had hoped, and operations had ended by the mid-1920s. Mining of other resources was also difficult. In 1932 the investors sold the Northern Exploration Company to the Norwegian government; its total property included 58 huts. Twenty-seven have survived, and the largest is Michelsenhuset, now known as Camp Morton. It has been restored by the government and is the largest structure at the site. A nearby hut, known as Clara Ville, is available for use by the Longyearbyen snowmobile club. The site also has some remains of mining equipment and the tracks of the mine railway.
