= Embassy of Norway, Moscow =

Coordinates: 55.7538°N 37.5961°E

Embassy of the Kingdom of Norway in Moscow
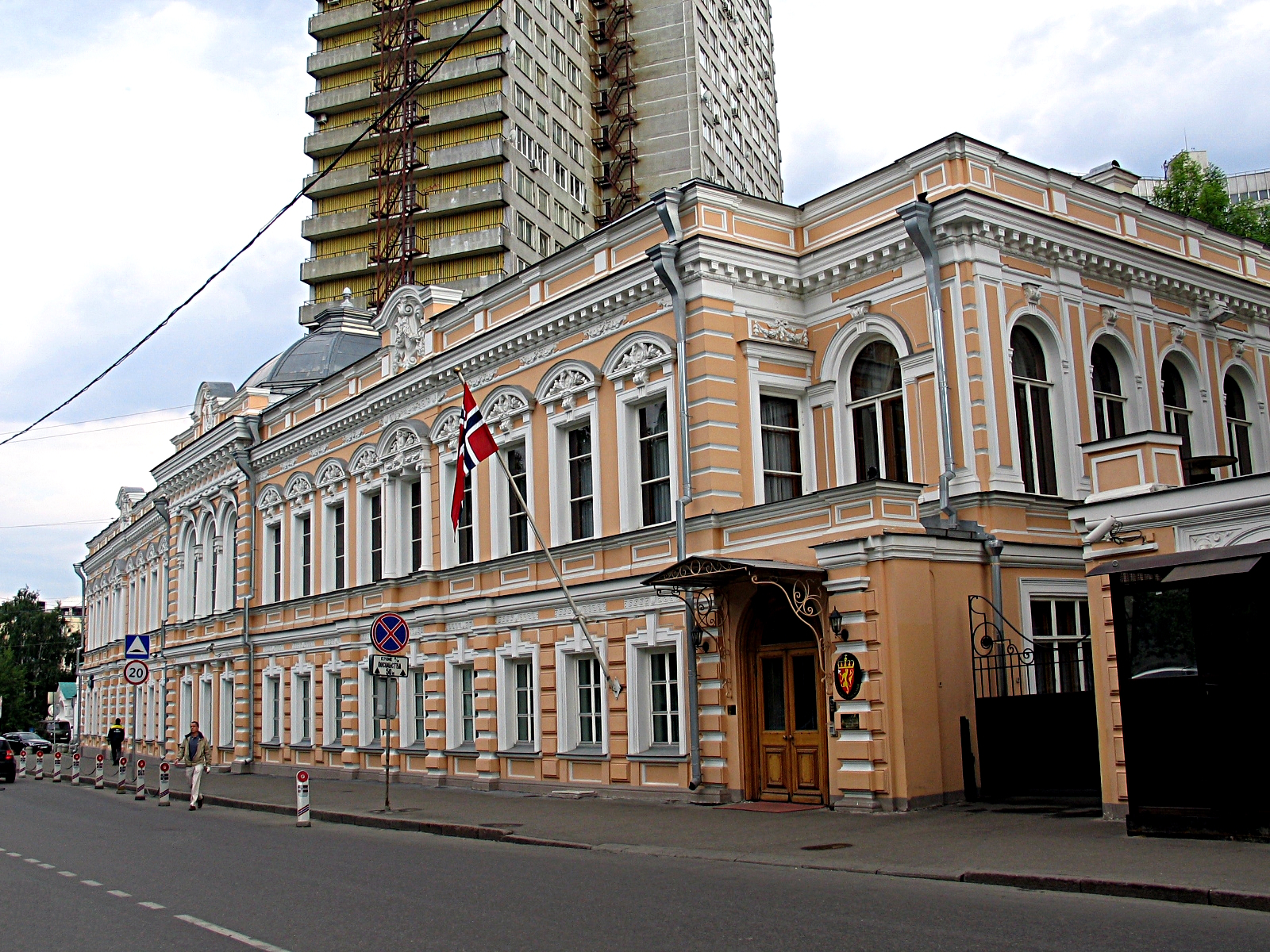
- Location: Moscow

The Embassy of the Kingdom of Norway in Moscow is the chief diplomatic mission of Norway in the Russian Federation. It is located at 7 Povarskaya Street (Russian: Поварская ул., 7) in the Arbat district of Moscow.

== See also ==
- Norway–Russia relations
- Diplomatic missions in Russia
