= History of Ny-Ålesund =

Coordinates: 78°55′N 11°56′E

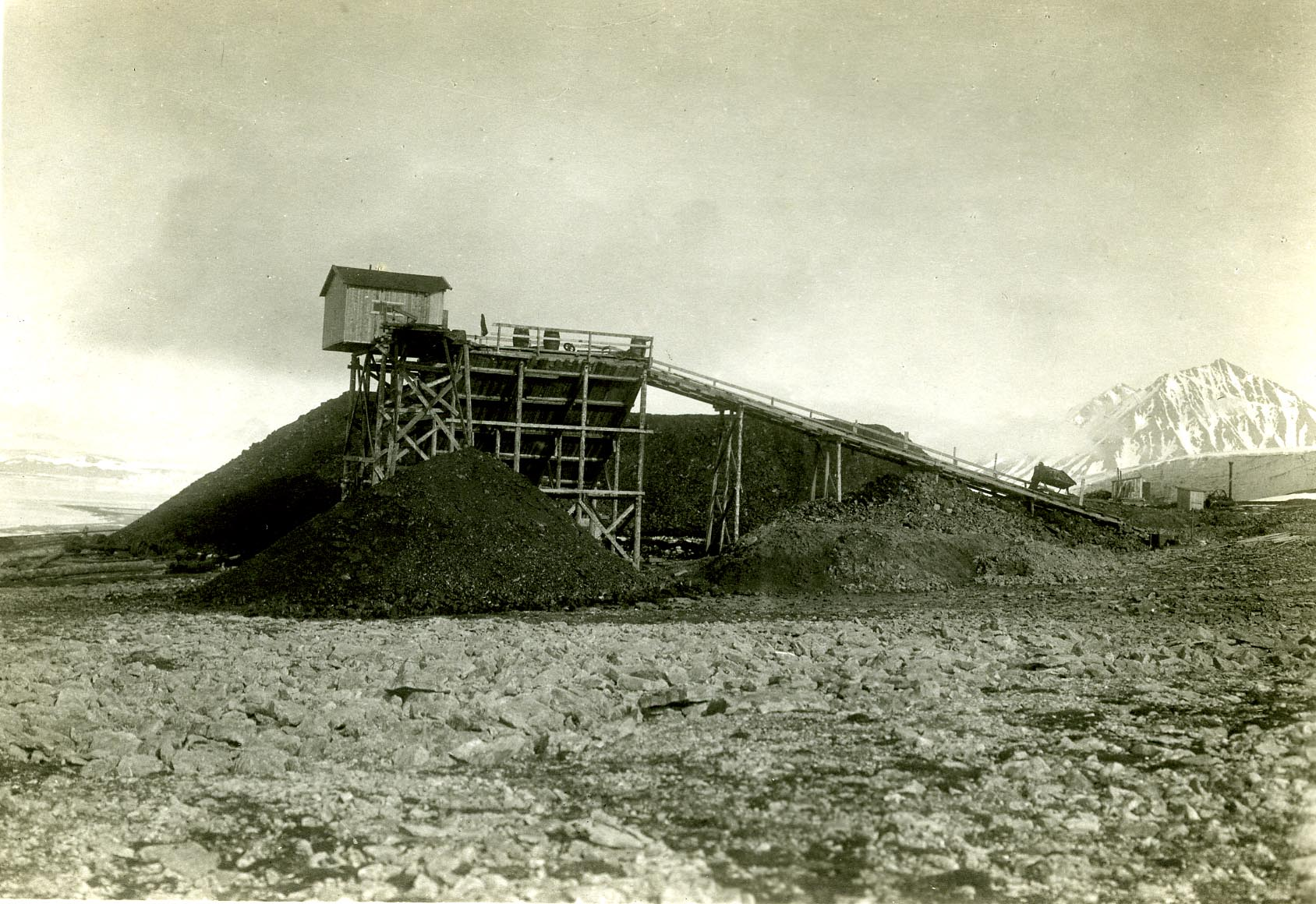
Kings Bay mining operations during the first years

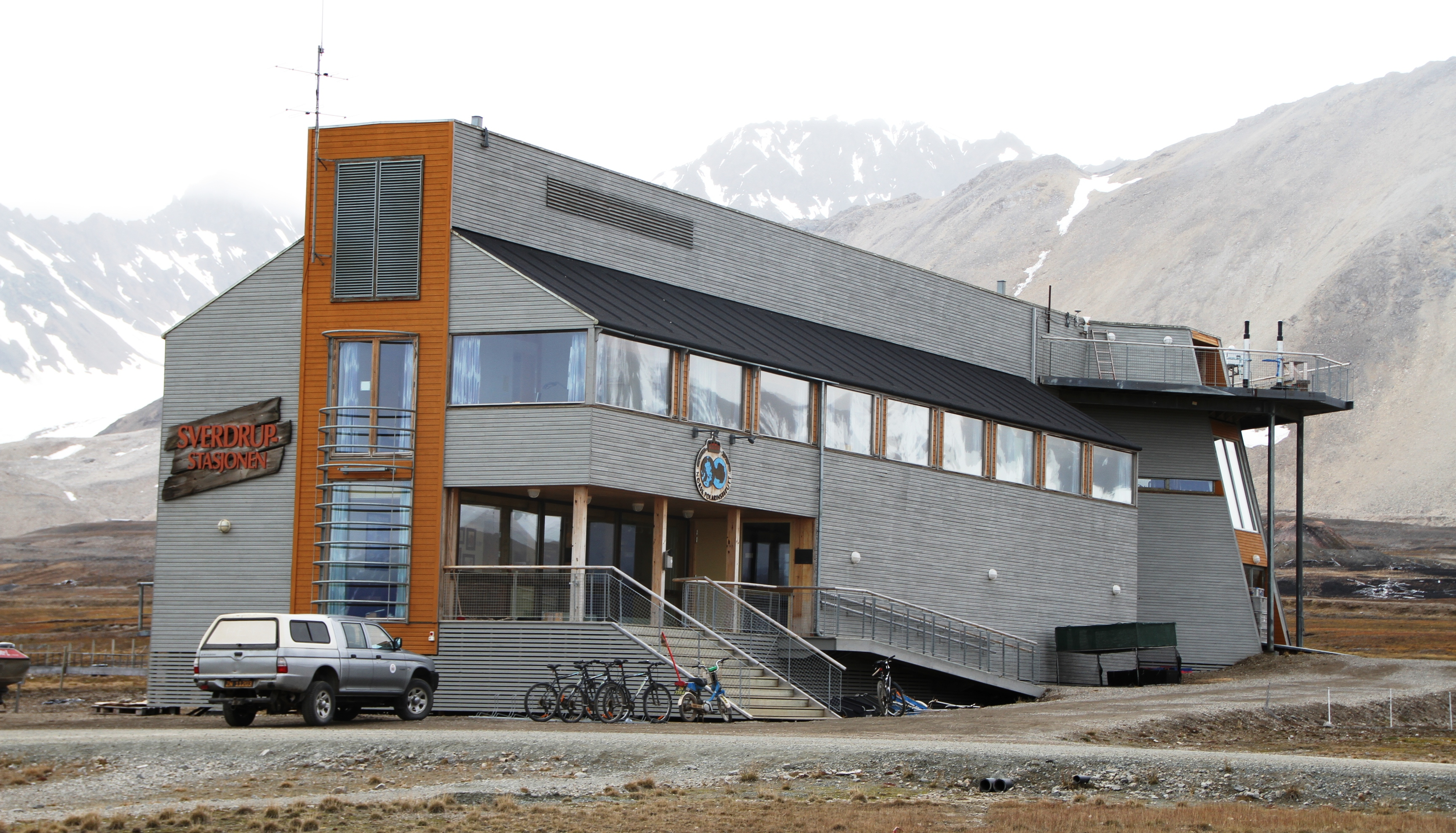
The Norwegian Polar Institute's station in Ny-Ålesund

The history of Ny-Ålesund began in 1610, when coal deposits were discovered around Kongsfjorden. Not until the 1860s were they investigated more carefully. Ålesund-based Peter Brandal bought the claims in 1916 and established the company Kings Bay. The town, originally known as Brandal City and Kings Bay, was founded that summer when coal mining commenced. The first research installation, a geophysical station at Kvadehuken, was established in 1920. The mining was soon unprofitable and was kept running through state subsidies. In the mid-1920s the town was used for a series of airship expeditions towards the North Pole.

Mining operations shut down in 1929 and Kings Bay was nationalized. The town was maintained during the 1930s, when saw the installation of a fisheries station and the establishment of a tourist hotel. The town was resettled with miners on 7 May 1940, just to experience an evacuation in August 1941. Miners returned on 13 August 1945 and the town was gradually expanded, including construction of a school, and new mines were opened. During the late 1950s Norsk Polar Navigasjon attempted to build an airport, but never received permission.

Ny-Ålesund experienced a series of mining accidents, with the ones in 1948, 1951 and 1952 each killing more than ten men. Safety measures were enforced, causing mines to be closed for upgrades and production remaining low. The final accident occurred on 5 November 1962, killing twenty-one miners. The succeeding Kings Bay Affair caused Kings Bay to terminate all mining operations from 5 November and forced Gerhardsen's Third Cabinet to resign.

Kings Bay retained the company town and gradually transformed it into a research community. Kongsfjord Telemetry Station and Ny-Ålesund Airport, Hamnerabben commenced operations in 1967, and the following year the Norwegian Polar Institute established itself in Ny-Ålesund. Starting in the 1970s the town experienced a gradual growth in research and tourism, with the Norwegian Institute for Air Research an early agent. Cultural heritage became an area of focus from the 1980s and from 1992 the authorities permitted foreign research institutions to establish permanent stations in town.

== Establishment ==
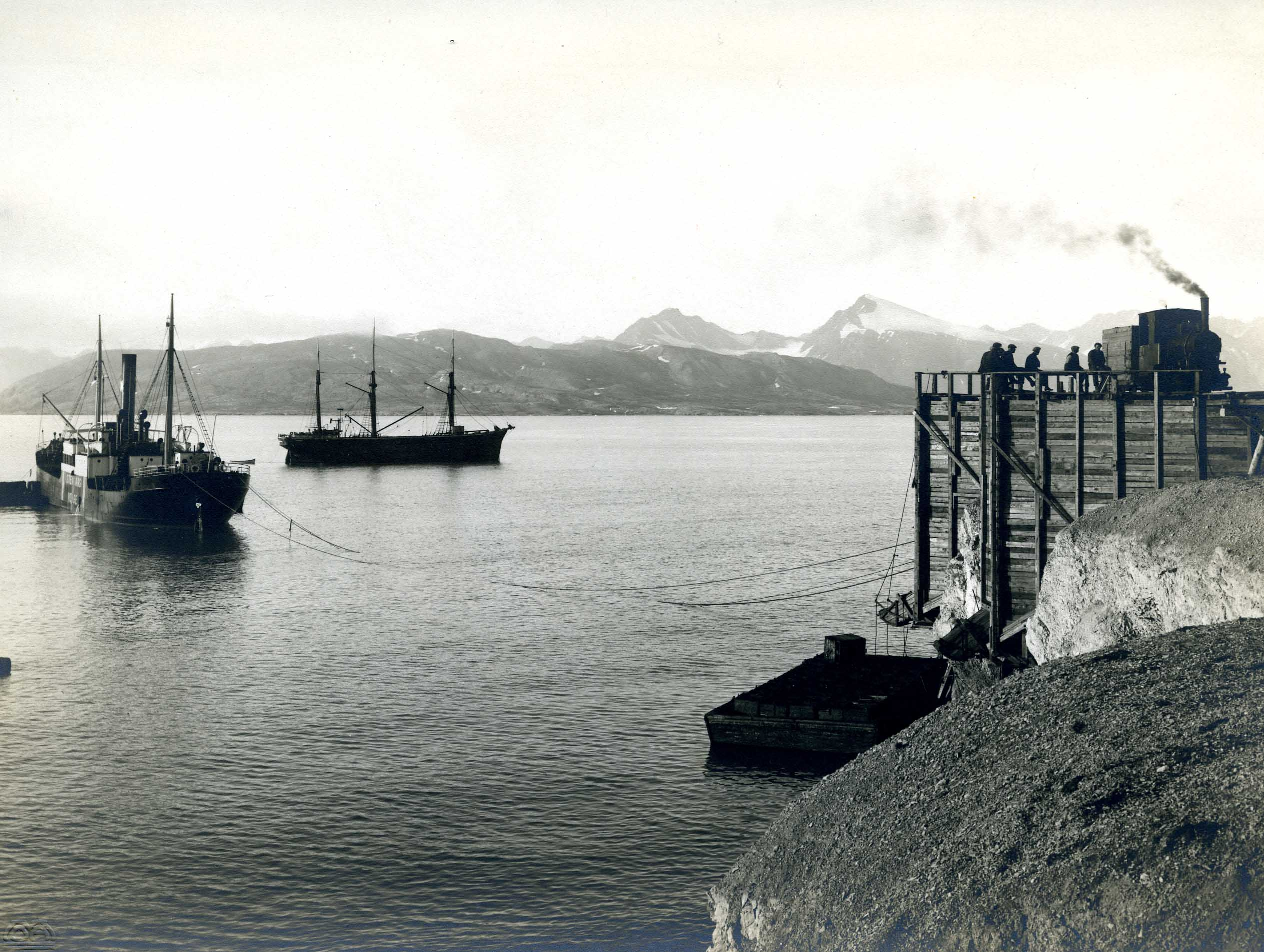
Ships anchored in the bay, with one of the locomotives

The coal deposits at Kongsfjorden were first discovered by Jonas Poole during a whaling expedition in the area in 1610. They did not receive more careful analysis until 1861, when Christian Wilhelm Blomstrand on Otto Torell's expedition carried out surveys. Additional samples were collected by a Swedish expedition in 1870. A/S Bergen–Spitsbergen Kulgrubekompani was founded in 1901 and, led by Skipper Bernhard Pedersen, laid claims at both Kings Bay and Adventfjorden. The claims at Kings Bay were never properly followed up as the company instead chose to focus on its other find. Ernest Mansfield claimed to have made claims to coal fields on the south side of Kongsfjorden in 1905 and 1906, which were sold to The Northern Exploration Co. Ltd. in 1910. During a scientific expedition in 1909 and 1910, later professor Olaf Holterdahl conducted geological sampling. In the ensuing five years, Green Harbour Coal Co. sent expeditions from Green Harbour. This included the construction of a test shaft. A hut was built in 1912 by the expedition on MK Onsø.

Green Harbour's owner, Christian Anker, died in 1912. The estate unsuccessfully attempted to sell the claim for four years. In the end it proposed that Ålesund Municipality buy the rights. At this point Ålesund shipper Peter Brandal was desperately looking for a source of coal, as he had been black-listed by the United Kingdom. The rights cost 250,000 Norwegian krone (NOK). Brandal dispatched two ships and sixty men to Kings Bay for the summer of 1916. They arrived on 21 July and immediately started breaking surface coal and in the shaft. In the latter alone the first expedition succeeded at collecting 300 tonnes. Brandal formally transferred the ownership of the claims to the newly established company Kings Bay Kull Comp. A/S on 14 December 1916. In addition to Brandal, it was owned by M. Knutsen, Trygve Klausen and Tryge Jervell and the company received a share capital of NOK 500,000. The company set up its offices in Kristiania (Oslo), although they moved to Ålesund within a year.

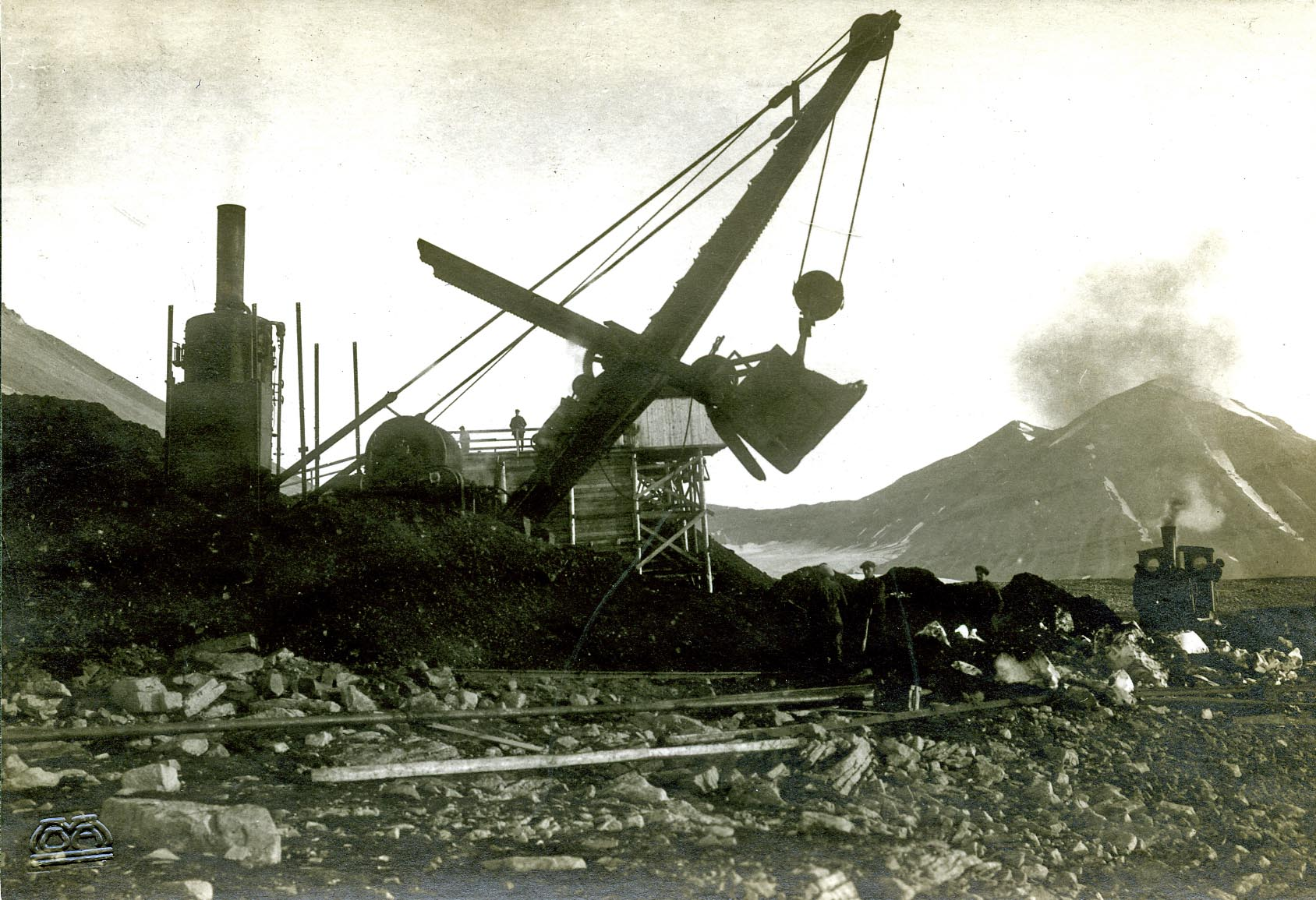
Loading equipment in the early years

Jens K. Bay was hired as the first managing director. Thirty people were sent by SS Carl to Kings Bay for the 1917 season. Planning of the mining community started, first with the site of the town. SS Deneb arrived with 100 men and supplies such as railway tracks and two locomotives on 26 August. By winter thirteen buildings had been erected and2.2 kilometers (1.4 mi) of railway laid. The company was not permitted to erect a radio telegraphy station. This caused communications to have to be sent by skiers by land to Longyearbyen, which resulted in an amputation in February 1918. The company therefore pressed for permission to establish a telegraphy station. A post office opened in 1918.

Sixty-four people stayed the winter of 1917–18, with mining being carried out in the Agnes Mine. They were supplemented from May 1918, bringing the summer population to 300. Jervell sold his shares to the other owners on 2 April. The 1918 season saw twenty shipments and the arrival of a third locomotive. Nine additional buildings were constructed, and the Advokaten Mine was opened. The winter of 1918–19 saw 143 people stay the winter, rising to 250 the following summer. During the first years several names were in use for the settlement, including Kings Bay, Kingsbay and Brandal City. Ny-Ålesund came into use in the early 1920s and was soon the official name of the settlement.

== First mining period ==
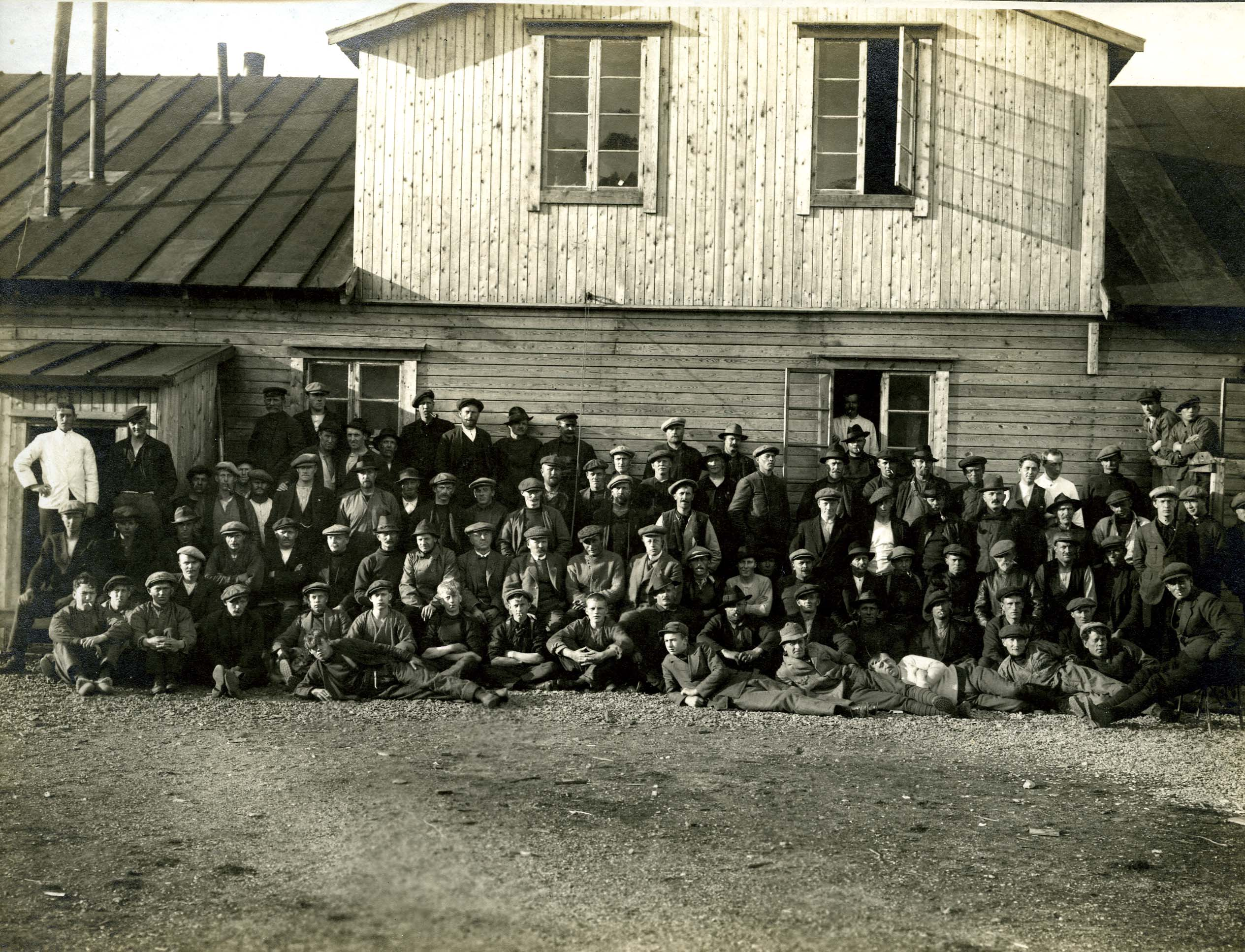
The 1918 crew

The mining was hit by two strikes in 1919, the first lasting from the summer to October, and the second from November to January 1920. Shipping took place from May through October, with 35,000 tonnes being shipped out in 1920. The company hired Trygve Klausen as managing director and built a quay and a shed in Harstad. By 1919 the company had fallen into severe financial difficulties. A British consortium offered to buy the mine. The issue was brought to the Ministry of Trade and Industry, who presented the issue for Parliament. The importance of keeping a Norwegian mining operation was articulated both in lieu of keeping a Norwegian presence on archipelago, which would soon fall under Norwegian sovereignty, but also in the need for keeping Norwegian jobs. A deal was struck whereby the ministry bought 30,000 tonnes of coal for NOK 6 million, while the owners were obliged to not sell the company without state permission.

By 1921 the number of women living in Ny-Ålesund grew to twenty-two and there were twenty-three children who spent the winter. Falling coal prices in 1921 saw the company receive further subsidies from the state. Throughout the 1920s the population varied from year to year. The peak summer population hit 319 men, 29 women and 8 children in 1923, and a low 188 employees in 1929. The winter population varied between 276 in 1926–27 and a low 158 in 1928–29. From the 1920s and onwards there was a limited amount of tourist traffic visiting Ny-Ålesund.

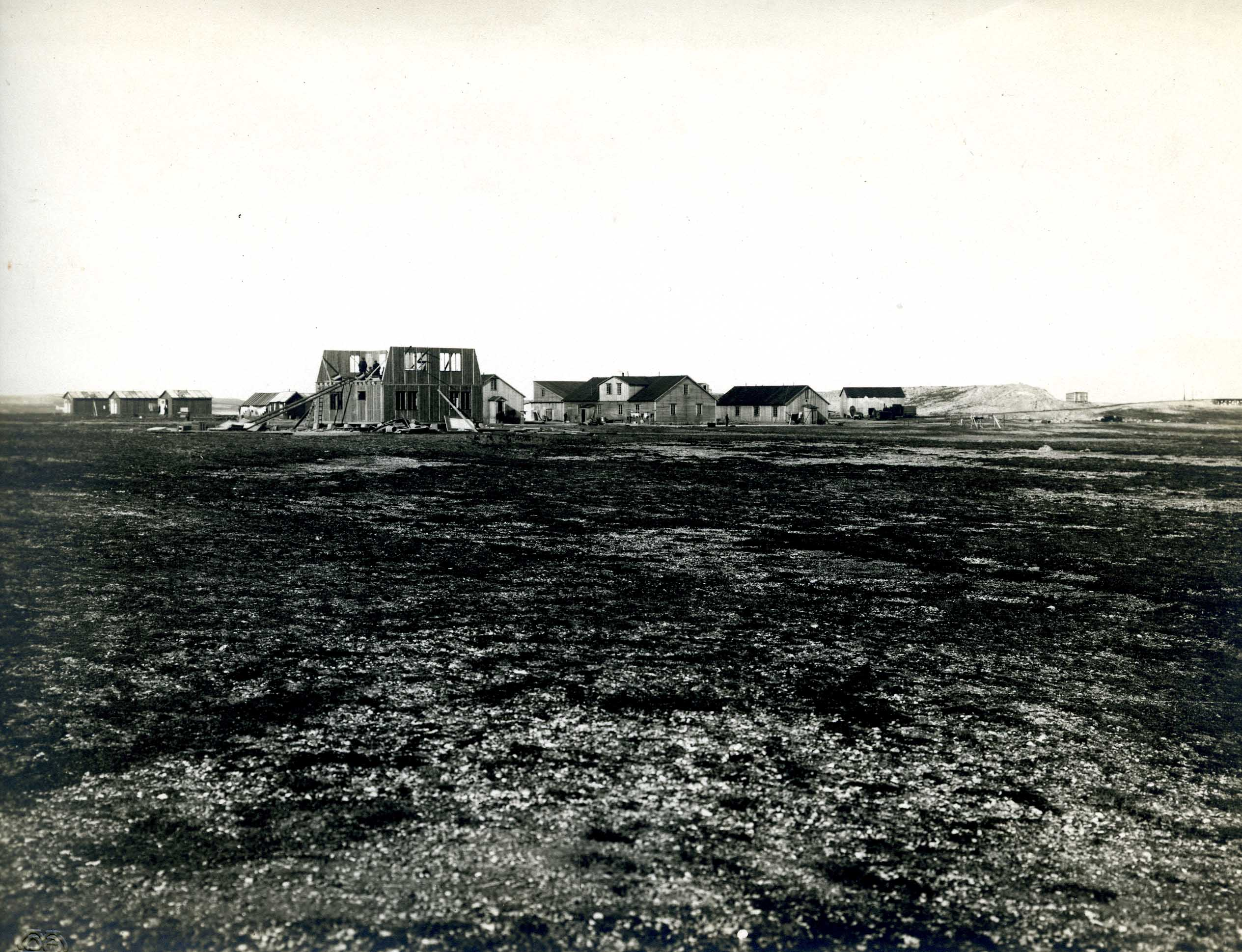
The town in the late 1910s

The Geophysical Institute of Tromsø established a geophysical station at Kvadehuken in 1920, consisting of a small hut and a radio mast allowing communication via Ny-Ålesund. It carried out meteorological surveys and geomagnetic field measurements and was manned by four men. Two of these died in February 1922 while attempting to rescue a trapper. The station was closed in 1924 due to lack of funding. The Church of Norway never established a presence in Ny-Ålesund, although the minister at Svalbard Church in Longyearbyen visited Ny-Ålesund irregularly. Most of the children in town were below school age. However, during the 1920–21 winter there were 23 children in town and an improvised school was taken into use for the year.

The Ministry of Trade and Industry carried out geological surveys in 1922 and renewed the purchase agreement. Production hit 91,000 tonnes in 1923, and then stabilized for the rest of the 1920s, at between 89,000 and 99,000 tonnes per year. Production moved to the Olsen Mine and the Sofie Mine in 1924. Kings Bay attempted coal liquefaction from 1924 to 1927 in cooperation with Greaker Cellulosefabrik. Four hundred tonnes of oil were produced, but the endeavor failed to become profitable. The labor union, Kings Bay Arbeiderforening, was founded in 1925, although many of the workers had previously ad hoc organized themselves.

Northern Exploration Company had conducted trial operations with mining on Blomstrandhalvøya, a headland across Kongsfjorden from Ny-Ålesund, in 1906. The British company set forth claims to the southern part of the bay in 1919, arguing that they had conducted a valid occupation of that area as well. An agreement was struck between the British company and the Government of Norway on 26 October 1925, whereby two-thirds of the land in question was waived and variously given to Kings Bay, Kulspids, Stavanger Spitsbergen and the government for £37,000. The remaining areas were bought by the state in 1932. Falling coal prices led to a production halt during the winter of 1925–26, in which only 17 men stayed the winter. Ordinary operations resumed in 1926, with production commencing in the Ester Mine.

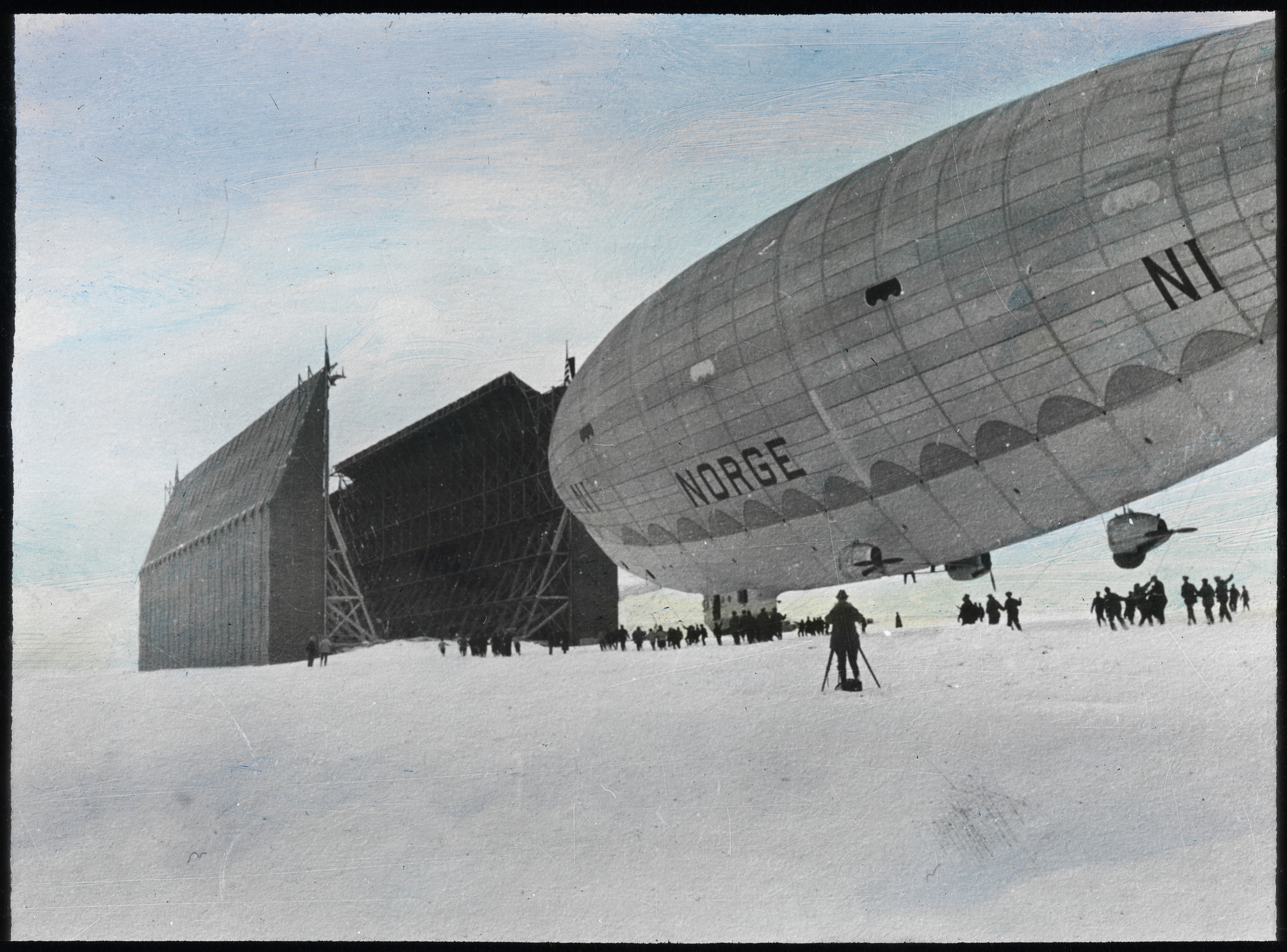
Norge in Ny-Ålesund on 7 May 1926

Between 1925 and 1928, four attempts were made to reach the North Pole by air from Ny-Ålesund. In May 1925, Roald Amundsen used Ny-Ålesund as a base for two flying boats, but the expedition failed to come closer than 88 degrees north. On 9 May 1926, Floyd Bennett and Richard E. Byrd used Ny-Ålesund as both the starting and landing for their expedition. Although they claimed to have reached the pole, there is strong evidence that they could not have accomplished this. On 11 May, Amundsen and Umberto Nobile's airship Norge left Ny-Ålesund and traveled via the North Pole to Alaska. This is regarded as the first successful expedition to the North Pole. After two short skirmishes, Nobile's airship Italia left Ny-Ålesund on 23 May 1928 to reach the North Pole, but crashed on the return. The flying boats did not require any specific infrastructure, although they had to be brought by ship to Ny-Ålesund, where they were assembled. They took off from a manually groomed air strip on snow. For the airship expeditions, a hangar and a mast were needed, completed on 15 February 1926.

The first fatal mining accident took place in the Ester Mine on 16 December 1926, killing two miners. Four men were killed on 20 April 1927 when a 130-meter (430 ft) section of a shaft in the same mine collapsed after a gas explosion. An accident on 16 August 1929 killed to miners, and from that season the ministry decided to terminate the subsidies and halt production due to the company's lack of profitability. The company hired three to four men to stay in the town each winter, including a telegraphist.

== Nationalization ==
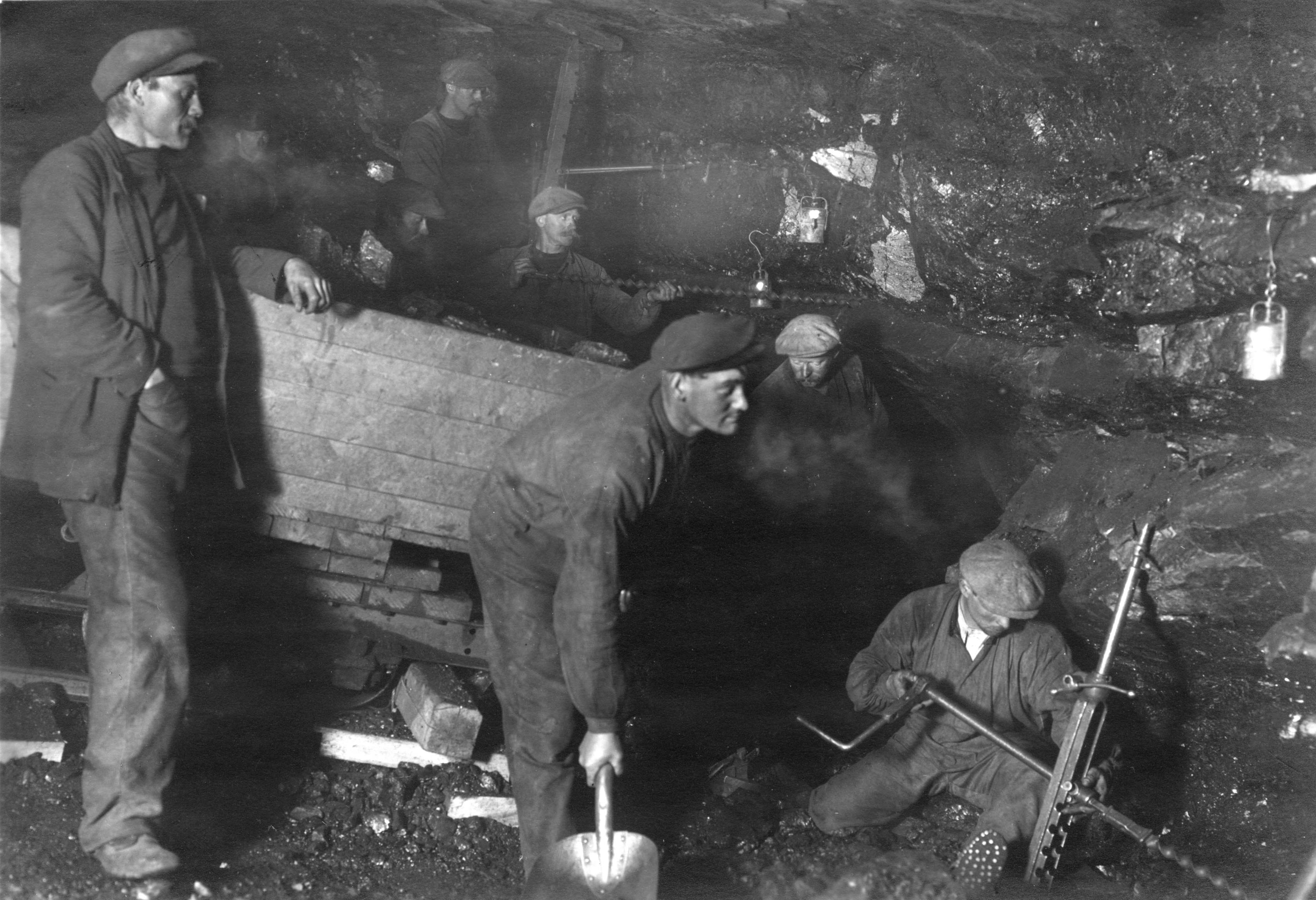
Miners in the Agnes Mine

As of 1 January 1929 Kings Bay owed NOK 6.2 million plus interest of NOK 3.6 million to the government and NOK 8.8 million to Aalesunds Kreditbank. The government paid the bank NOK 125,000 for its claims on 24 February 1931, becoming the sole creditor. The owners agreed to transfer their ownership to the state on 4 November 1931, which took effect on 23 December 1933. Ny-Ålesund was kept in a state of readiness to resume production. Kings Bay negotiated purchasing Nya Svenska Stenkolaktiebolaget Spetsbergen's mine at Svea, which had been dormant since a 1925. This was not carried out and instead the mine was sold to Store Norske.

With reports in 1934 of large quantities of cod off the western coast of Spitsbergen, a proposal was made to establish a fisheries station at Ny-Ålesund. The Ministry of Trade and Industry supported the proposal and granted NOK 20,000 for the establishment, which was contracted to Kings Bay. Five men were dispatched in 1935 and they started repairs of the town, including fetching materials and buildings from Ny-London, located across the bay. Among the main tasks of the station was steaming of cod liver oil and salting of the cod, in addition to providing supplies. The station was popular amongst the fishermen, but went with a deficit of NOK 15,500 the first year. A NOK 50,000 grant was issued the following year and fourteen men were stationed at Ny-Ålesund. The Directorate of Fisheries recommended that the arrangement continue, but the ministry was not willing to continue the funding and the station closed ahead of the 1937 season. It was taken over by Jacob Kjøde, who also operated a station at Grønfjorden, and retained operation for three seasons.

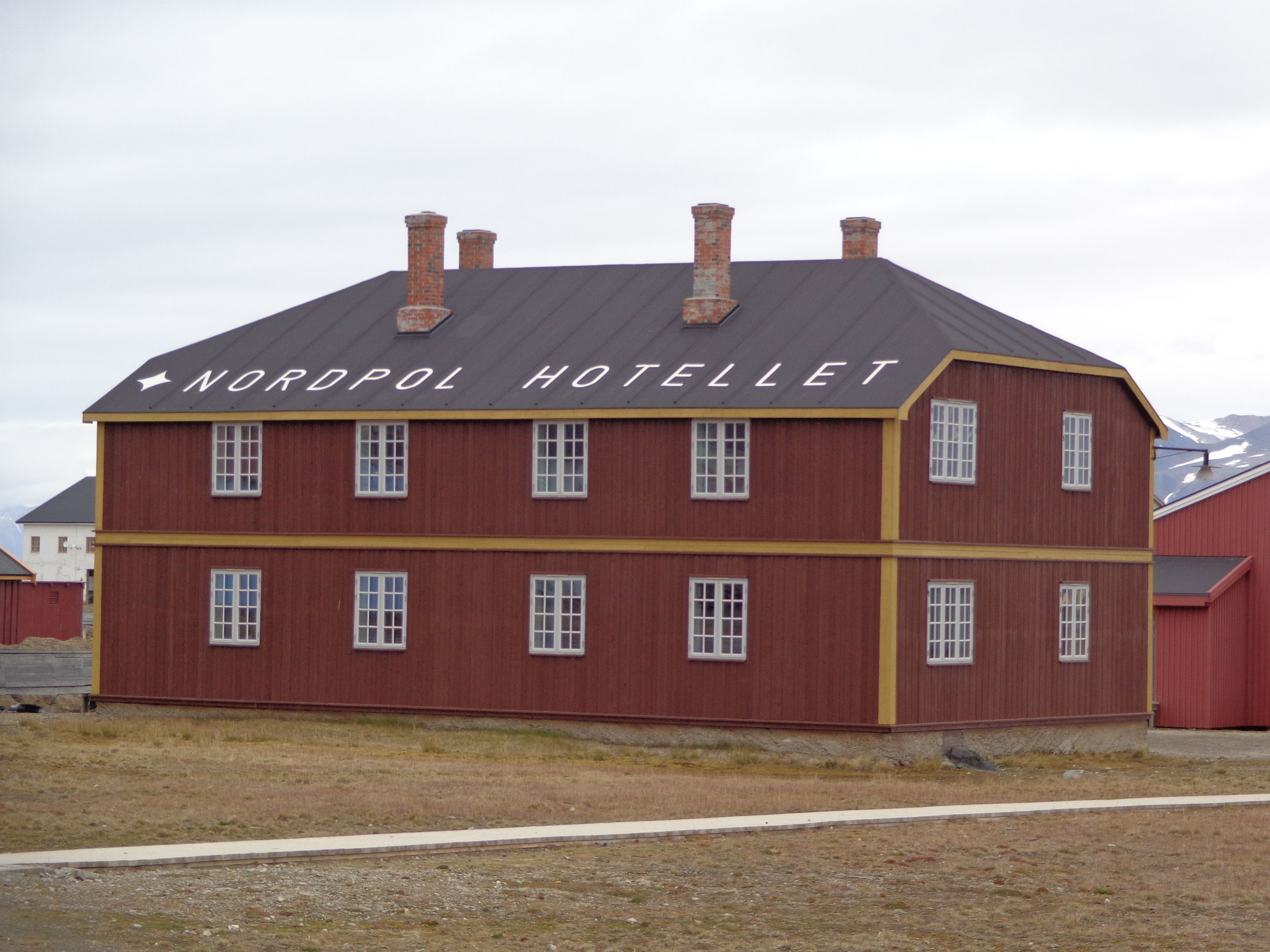
The North Pole Hotel

At the same time, Adolf Hoel encouraged the establishment of a hotel. Laura Borgen signed an agreement with Kings Bay and started the North Pole Hotel in one of the former housing units. During 1936 six cruise ships with 4,000 passengers visited the town. Kjøde took over ownership of the hotel from 1937. A/S Nordpolhotellet was incorporated on 22 June 1938 and used four buildings for its hotel operations. The upgraded hotel opened on 3 September 1939, but was closed only days later following the news of the German invasion of Poland. Kings Bay moved its head office from Ålesund to Oslo on 22 June 1939.

The break-out of the Second World War resulted in the need for increased coal production in Norway, and the Ministry of Trade and Industry appointed committee to consider production increases. Its conclusions were announced on 5 April, where it was recommended that production resume in Ny-Ålesund. Kings Bay aimed at starting production from the summer of 1941, as the war made earlier production start difficult. The town was re-settled on 7 May 1941 and work started in the Ester II Mine. However, production would not last long. The Allied commanders determined that they would not prioritize to protect Svalbard and determined in August that they would evacuate the island. A fleet arrived on 25 August and evacuated the population on 29 August. Critical infrastructure, such as the power station and the railways, were blown up.

From January 1942 Kings Bay had two boards, one in Oslo and one in London. This was an arrangement which lasted until the end of the war in 1945. The London board worked on various plans to resume production, but none of these materialized. Instead, the Oslo board worked on long-term plans to modernize the mining operations, perhaps with the ability to commence operations after the war ended. Allied intelligence conducted a few investigations of Ny-Ålesund during the war, including both aerial observations, and discovered that German troops must have searched the site.

== Second mining period ==
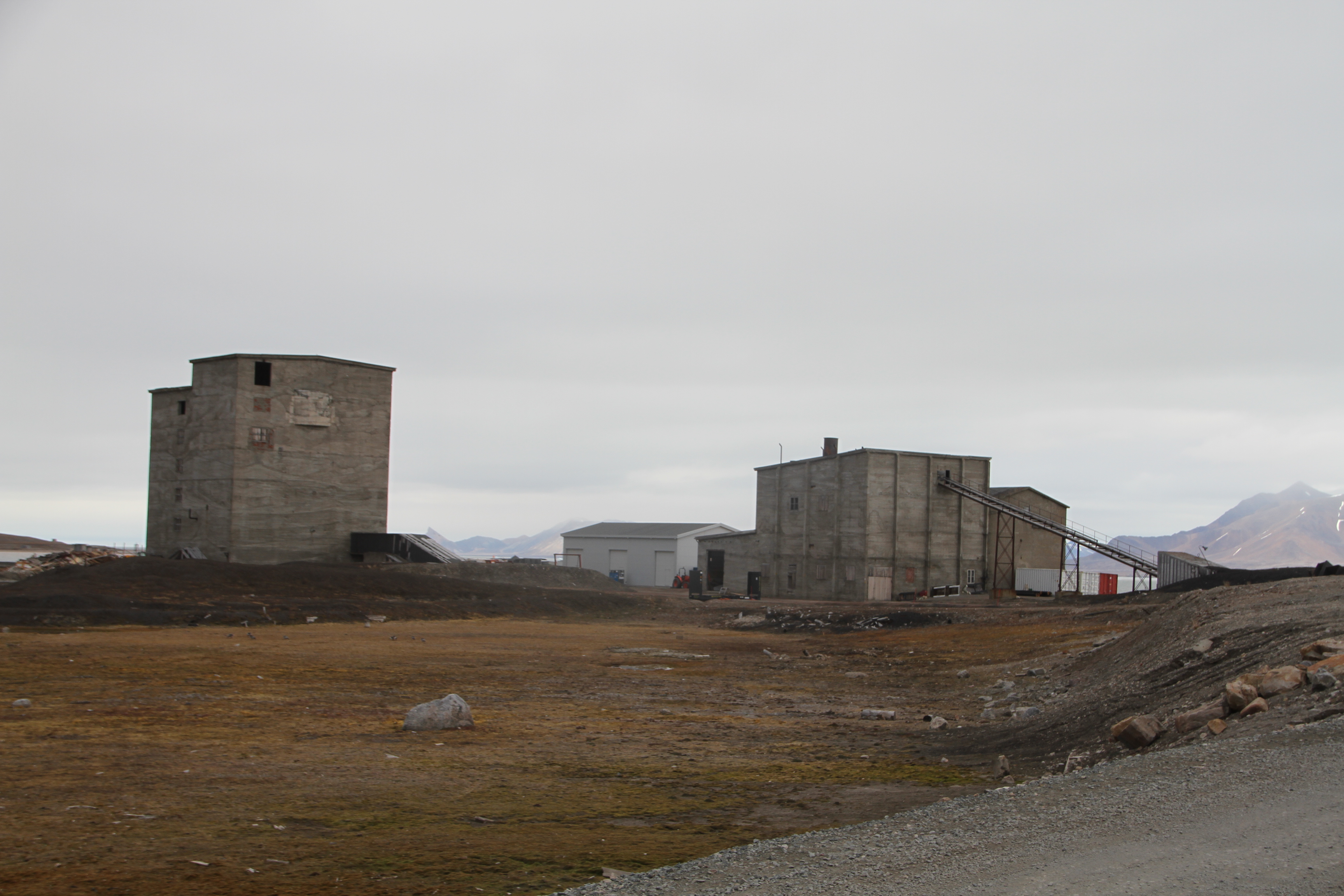
The former coal-fired power station

Kings Bay dispatched a crew after the war ended, with the first 90 workers arriving at Ny-Ålesund on 13 August 1945. Five new buildings were built and the Ester II Mine had to be cleared, so production did not resume until November. The power station was not operational until the following spring. Ove Roll Lund was hired as manager from 1946, but he was shot and killed by an insane employee on 25 August. Around the same time mining started in Ester III. The towns population was between 140 and 170. Production reached 61,000 tonnes in 1947. The following year a new separation plant was built and the power station burned down, having to be rebuilt. There were three fatal accidents the first three years of operation, each killing one miner. Then on 4 December 1948 an explosion took place in Ester III, killing fifteen men. Production halted until 14 February 1949 while the accident was investigated.

From 1946, the Royal Norwegian Air Force started serving Ny-Ålesund with their Consolidated PBY Catalina amphibian aircraft. The aircraft were able to land if there was no ice on the fjord and lighting and weather permitted it. The first flight took place on 10 May and consisted of post drops. No further flights were carried out until 1949; one of the flights that year was an air ambulance operation. Weather observations were carried out in 1950 to 1953, and again after 1961.

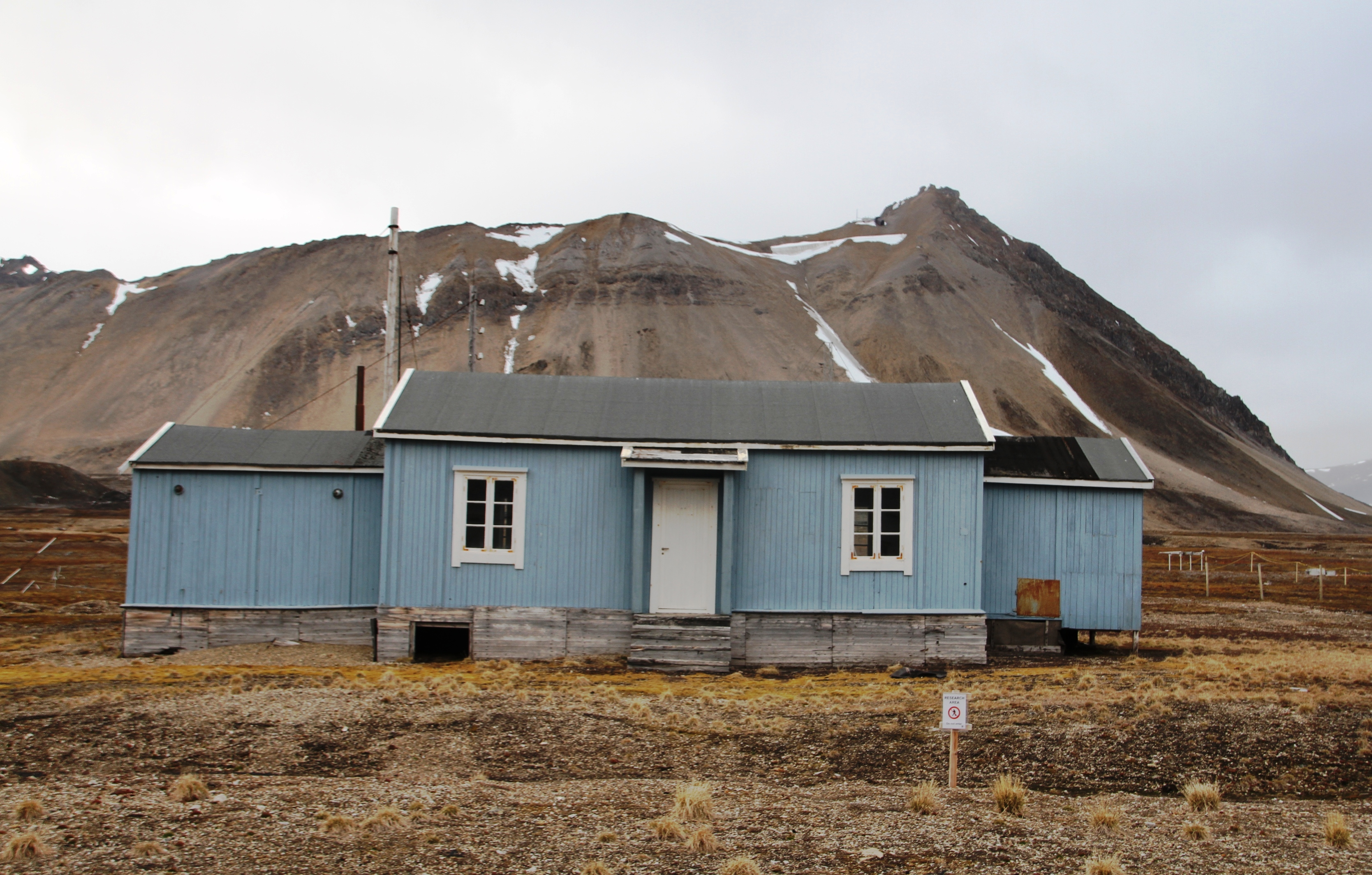
The building for Ny-Ålesund Radio

Kings Bay issued its own private currency between 1947 and 1964. It only issued bills and the money's validity was limited to Svalbard. A women's group, Polarklokken, was founded in 1949. A cinema was built in the community center with shows in the weekend. There was a dance once a month in the same site. Other cultural activities included a marching band and a sports club. A school was established in 1950, as there were five children of school age, which remained in operation until 1963. This caused an increase in the number of children living in town, with between 14 and 18 pupils attending the school after 1958.

The mine flooded on 26 April 1949 and it took half a year to empty it. Production that year ended at 40,000 tonnes. A series of upgrades were carried out, bringing production up to 80,000 tonnes in 1951. On 7 January 1951 there was an explosion in the Ester V Mine, killing nine men. The same day a mining explosion in Longyearbyen killed six people, and a common investigation was carried out by a government committee. A year later, on 19 March 1952, yet another explosion took place in the Ester Mine, this time killing nineteen men. The miners sent a letter to the Minister of Justice stating that they would not work until the safety measures proposed by the previous two commissions were carried out. A new commission was dispatched to Ny-Ålesund, which found that some of the safety measured had been carried out, and some had not. It recommended that new safety measures be implemented. In the meantime mining was placed on hold.

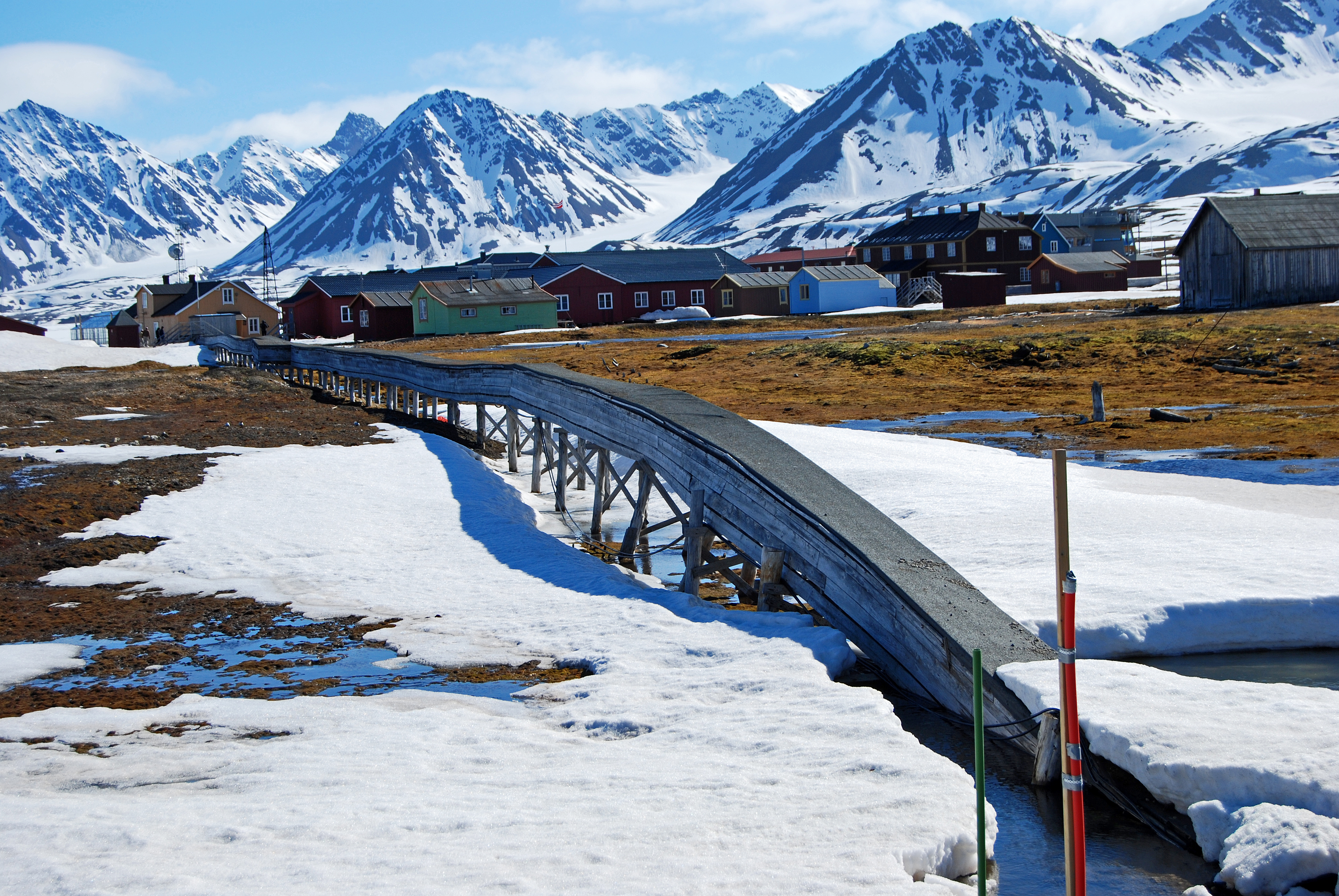
Pipelines and cables are located in wooden boxes to avoid permafrost

Parliament granted NOK 1.2 million to upgrade the mines, with the company having an operating deficit of NOK 2.9 million that year. A further grant of NOK 1.9 million was issued the following year. The population dropped to 72 while production was halted. In 1954 there was produced 5,000 tonnes of coal, mostly for the towns own consumption. By 1955 the estimates for continuing operation, mostly prominently the need for improved ventilation systems, reached an estimate of NOK 20 million. A certain amount of production was resumed, reaching 15,000 tonnes in 1955. Parliament approved a new production plan on 20 March 1956, which set a production goal of 200,000 tonnes of coal annually. The company built a new power station, bath and a fire station, as well as additional housing. Ester I was re-opened and upgraded. Production gradually increased to 47,000 in 1958, before falling again, in part because of falling coal prices.

In 1956 two brothers, Einar Sverre and Gunnar Sverre Pedersen proposed that an airport be built at Kvadehussletta, on the outer-most point of Brøggerhalvøya. Through their company Norsk Polar Navigasjon they initially planned for a 1,600-meter (5,200 ft) long runway, which could easily be expanded to 3,000 meters (9,800 ft). Kings Bay stated that they were open for negotiations. Funding was in part secured through the United States Armed Forces and the plans called for both the establishment of a hotel and for emergency landings of aircraft. The project was met by protests from the Soviet Union, who claimed the airport would violate the demilitarization clauses of the Svalbard Treaty. The issue resulted in a prolonged political debate with the Pedersens attempting to gain building permission and the Norwegian and Soviet governments attempting to hinder the construction. The issue gradually lost momentum, but the brothers did not stop working for the airport until 1965.

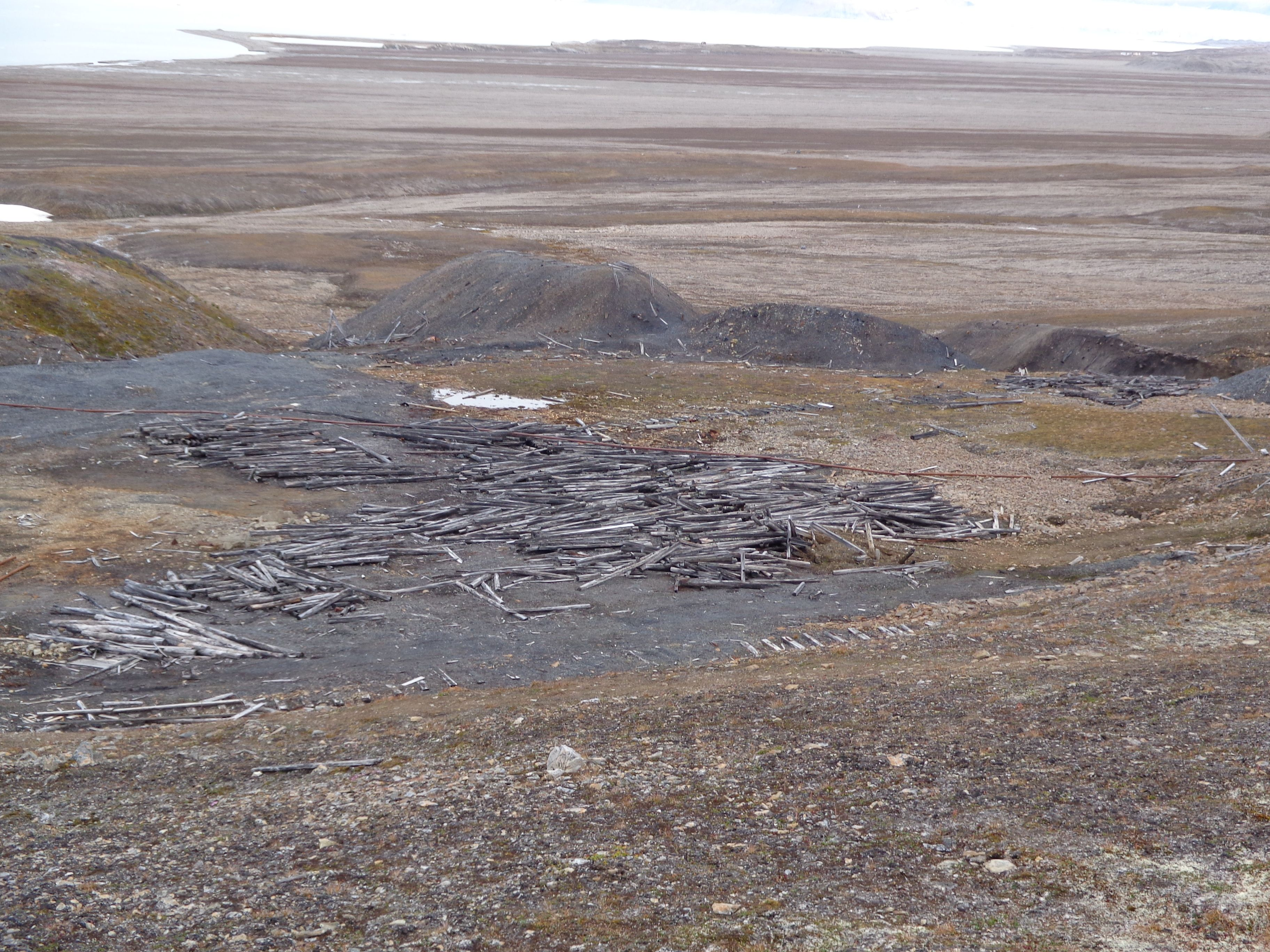
Remains of mining

A series of cultural investments were carried out in 1958: the newspaper Det nye Kingsbay was published, a public library was established and the school moved to a new building. By 1959 Ester I was depleted and the railway was closed—transport having been taken over by trucks. That year only 8,000 tonnes were exported. A new shaft was opened the following year, allowing mining to start in Vestre Senterfelt. Production in 1960 hit a record 79,000 tonnes of raw coal, which after being processed through the new coal preparation plant resulted in 51,000 tonnes. Start of a coke plant in Mo i Rana helped stimulate the domestic coal demand. Washed coal production hit 54,000 tonnes in 1961. By then NOK 21 million had been invested in the past years, although the coal prices had continued to fall, and especially in Norway the demand had diminished. Norway was retiring its last steam locomotives, but unlike in most of Europe it was not replicating the coal demand through construction of coal-fueled thermal power plants. By 1962 Ny-Ålesund had 25 family apartments and barracks for 210 male employees. Production hit 75,000 tonnes of washed coal in 1962.

== Kings Bay Affair ==
On 5 November 1962 the Østre Senterfelt Mine experienced an explosion, which killed 21 of the 25 men which were on the shift. The rescue operation provided difficult, and by 9 November only ten of the men had been found. The Ministry of Industry appointed a commission, led by Finn Midbøe, to investigate the accident. The arrived on 9 November and departed on the 16 November with the last coal ship to avoid being frozen stuck at Ny-Ålesund for the winter. Thus it never had an opportunity to enter the mine. The fire continued, while the lower levels were flooded. Permission to drain the shafts were never given, and the deceased were never brought up. Production continued in the new Vestre Senterfelt, while Østre Senterfelt remained closed, with 102 employees staying the winter.

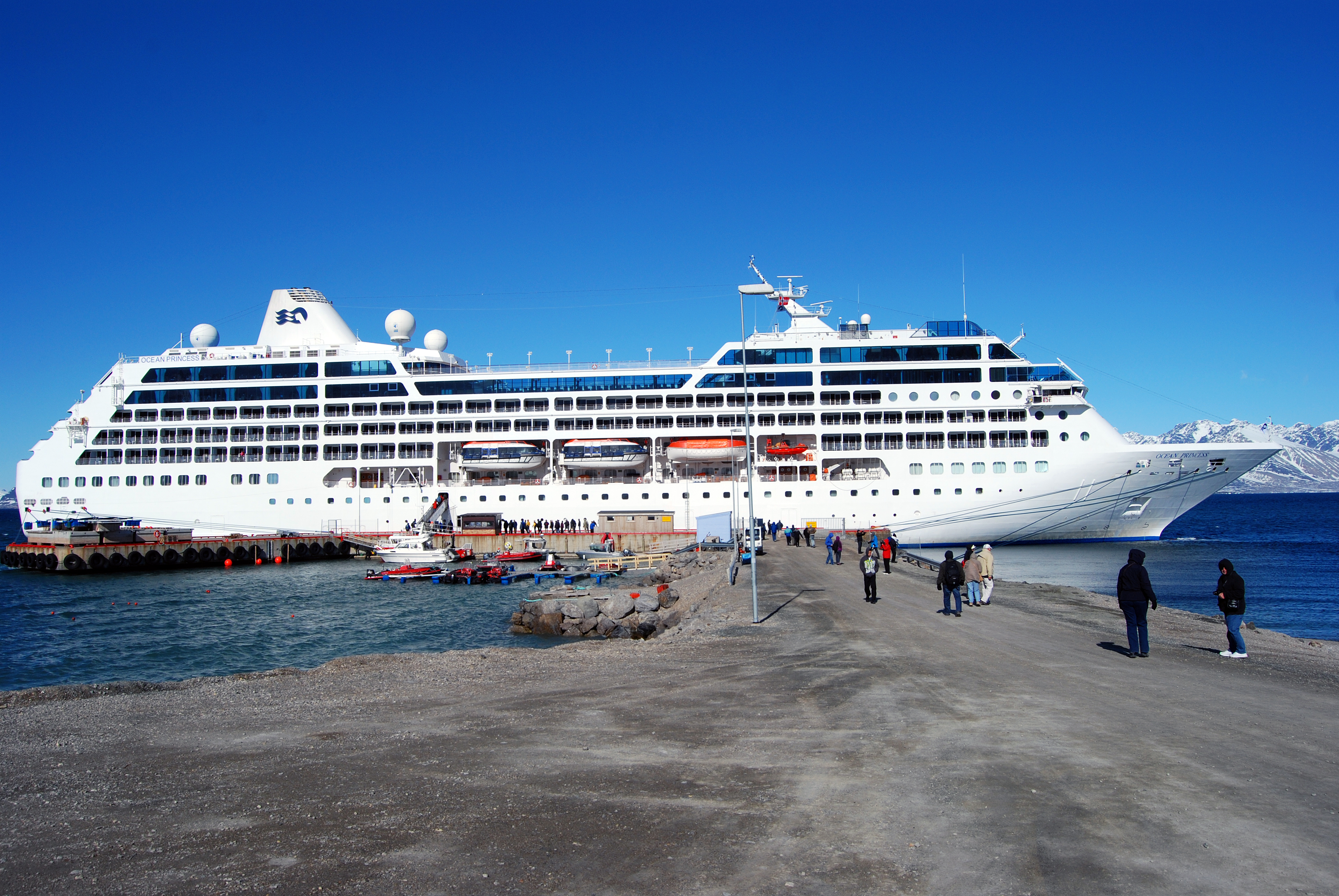
Ny-Ålesund has since its foundation seen regular visits by tourist ships

The government appointed a new commission, led by Per Tønseth, on 4 January. They were hindered from arriving at Ny-Ålesund until 15 May 1963, where it stayed for ten days. In its 27 May report it concluded that the accident had been caused by an explosion of methane which had again ignited coal dust. It criticized both Kings Bay for not following safety regulations and the Commissioner of Mining for not carrying out the necessary inspections. Kings Bay's board rejected the conclusions in the report, arguing that there had not been a coal dust explosion.

The accident became a major issue of debate in the press. The debate had ensued for half a year by the time the Tønseth report was published, and the mining company's on-site director, lacking regular postal service and thus ready access to newspapers, was not able to accurately correct any errors in the press. The publication of the report and the delay until the company could respond caused Parliament to delay its summer leave past 20 June 1963. That day Kjell Holler resigned as Minister of Industry and was replaced by Trygve Lie. The issue was debated in Parliament from 20 to 23 August, where the opposition criticized the government for a series of management errors, such as not ensuring that the Labor Inspection Authority had sufficient mining competence.

Following the 1961 election the Labor Party lost its Parliamentary majority for the first time since 1945. Gerhardsen's Third Cabinet was held in place by two pivoting seats held by the Socialist People's Party (SF). They and the center-right opposition voted in mis-confidence, forcing Einar Gerhardsen to resign. Parliament also voted to close the mining operations and issued NOK 22 million to pay Kings Bay's debt. Mining operations ceased on 5 November 1963. Lyng's Cabinet would only last 28 days, before SF supported a new vote of mis-confidence and helped appoint Gerhardsen's Fourth Cabinet. The Norwegian Prosecuting Authority originally announced on 31 October that four people would be prosecuted, although this was dropped by the Director of Public Prosecutions on 29 April 1964.

The decision in Parliament called for the termination of mining operations, but the site was to be kept in such a state that production could resume at a later date should new technology make mining safe. Kings Bay went through a gradual shut-down, first closing its office in Harstad and then in 1964, Ny-Ålesund. The company retained a small workforce in Ny-Ålesund to keep guard and clean up.

== Research ==
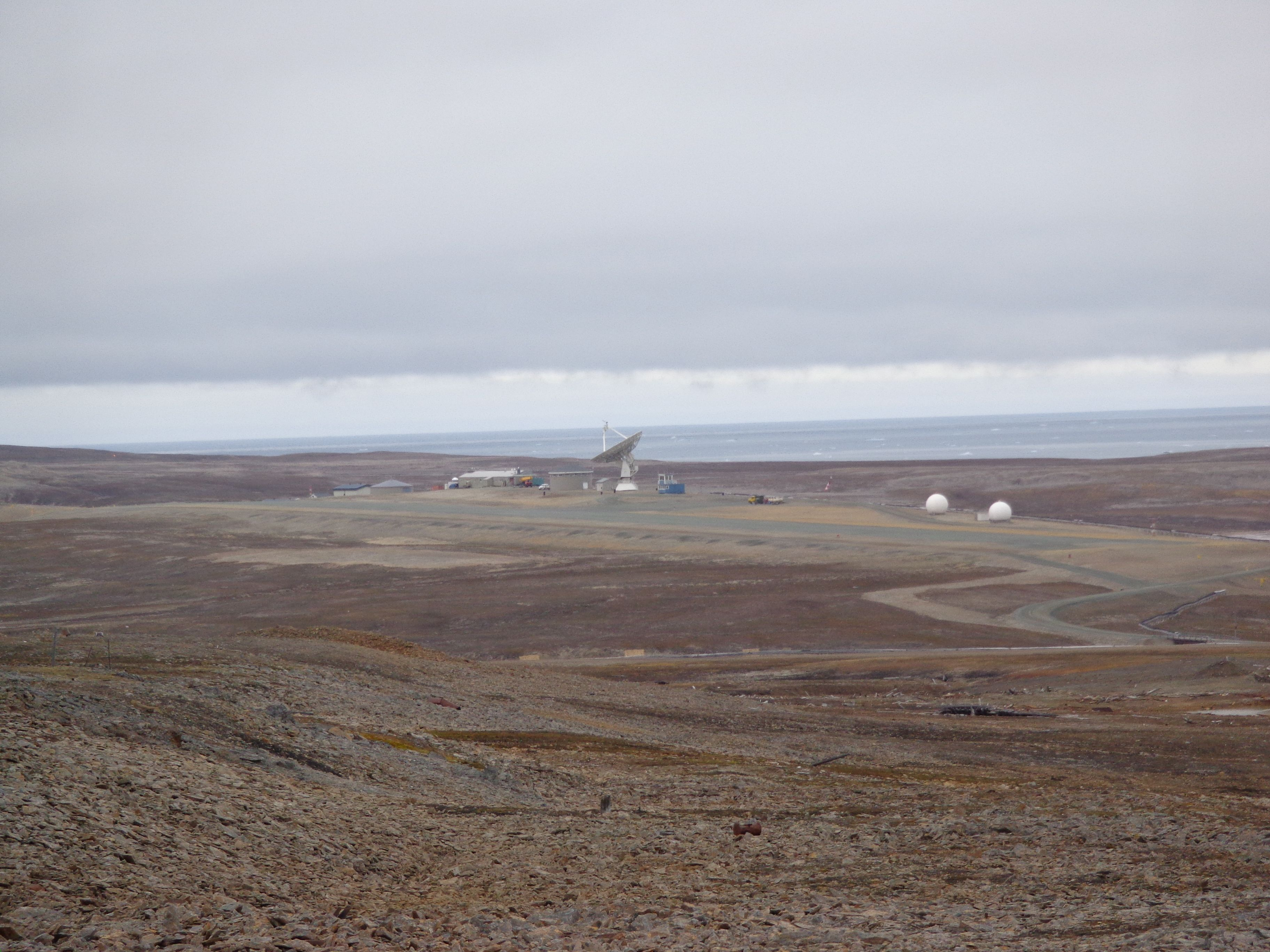
Ny-Ålesund Airport, Hamnerabben opened in 1967

With the establishment of the European Space Research Organization in 1964, Ny-Ålesund was approved as one of four sites for a telemetry station of the European Space Tracking Network. Specifically, Kongsfjord Telemetry Station was to track and communicate with the ESRO-1 and ESRO-2 satellites. Royal Norwegian Council for Scientific and Industrial Research (NTNF) was awarded the job of operating the station. As with nearly all new Norwegian activity, the establishment was met with Soviet protests. Construction started in May 1965 and NTNF planned to employ as much existing facilities as they could. NTNF was allowed to use buildings as needed for free. In exchange, NTNF maintained the entire village and paid insurance on the buildings they used.

With the telemetry station came the need for an airport to fly magnetic tapes to Germany. A road was built from the settlement to Hamnerabben, the site of the telemetry station. The top of the hill was sufficiently flat that a runway could be constructed. It was built by giving a 850-meter (2,790 ft) long straight section of the road a width of 40 meters (130 ft). Waste oil was poured on the gravel to bind it. A smaller road was built to the north of the runway to allow road transport while the runway was in use. Services were originally operated by Ski- og Sjøfly, but were later taken over by Svalbard-Fly, both of which had their Cessna 185 aircraft stationed in Ny-Ålesund.

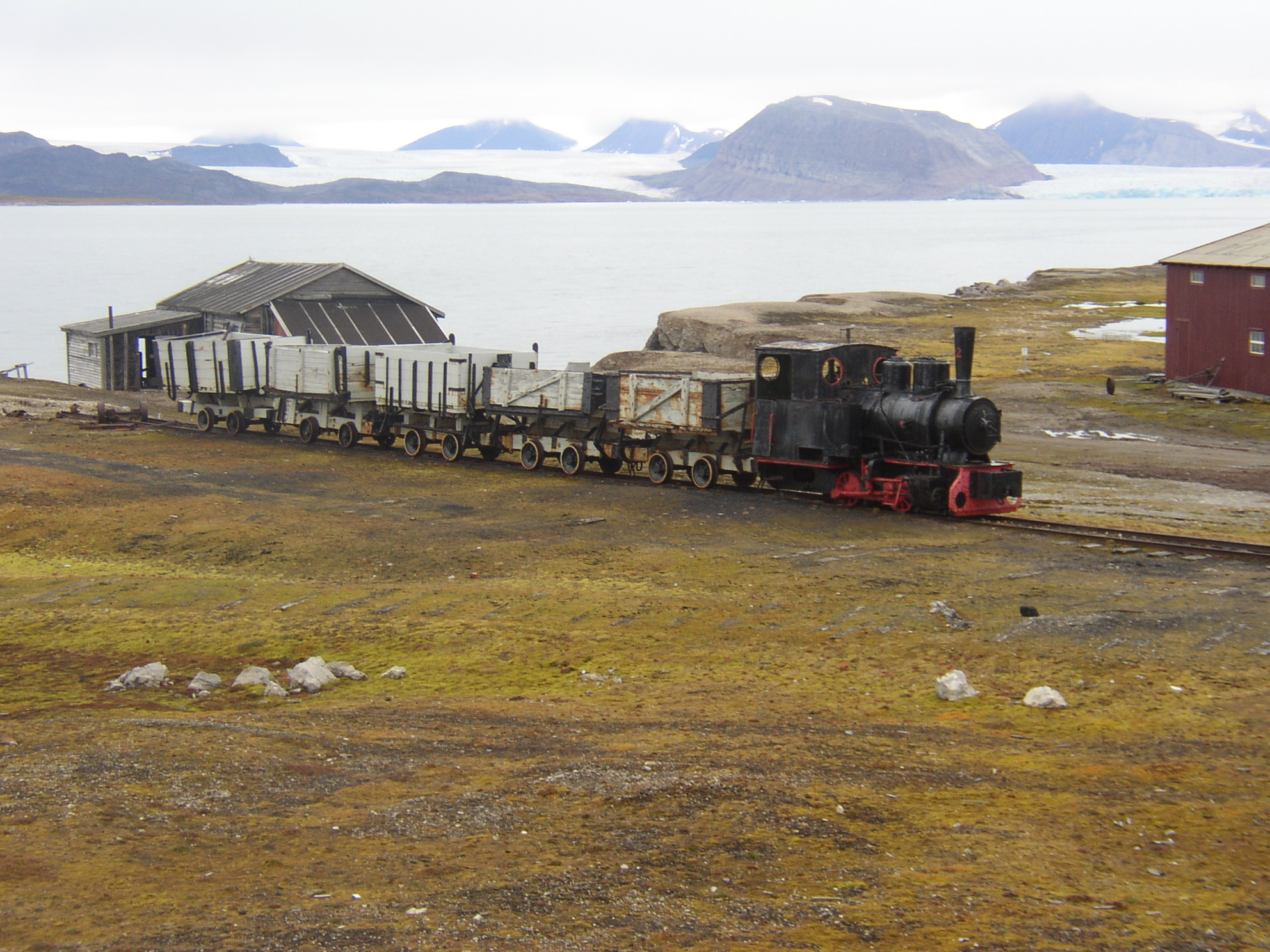
An old mining train which was preserved during the 1980s

Troms Fylkes Dampskibsselskap resumed operation of the hotel in 1965, which it leased for free. They only operated for two seasons, which about thirty patrons per year, losing money both years. The Norwegian Polar Institute established a scientific station in the town in 1966, and they moved an ionosphere measurement station from Isfjord Radio to Ny-Ålesund and stationed two staff there. Kings Bays operations during the second half of the 1960s was minimal, typically sending two men for guard and maintenance each summer. By 1968 there were 31 people working at the telemetry station. The Polar Institute increased its activity in Ny-Ålesund from 1968, although its winter population was limited to one. Kings Bay carried out work to secure its mining claims in its area, but it needed exemption if it was to succeed at keeping the claims, which would variously be canceled between 1966 and 1970.

After the initial ESRO program was initiated, the agency moved towards satellites with a higher orbital eccentricity and escape orbits. The facilities in Ny-Ålesund were unsuitable for telemetry with such satellites, as they would operate at a different frequency, the size of the antenna dish was too small and the ground station's geographical position was out of range. Because of the change of ESRO's focus, the need for a telemetry station on Svalbard disappeared after the termination of ESRO's initial program, and the facility was closed in 1974. After the telemetry station closed in 1974, the airport was taken over by Kings Bay. Svalbard Airport, Longyear, opened in 1975, allowing better facilities and connection with scheduled flights to the mainland. At the same time, Lufttransport established itself at Svalbard Airport and took over the flights to Ny-Ålesund.

The Ministry of Industry proposed in 1970 that Kings Bay be merged with another state-owned mining company, Adventdalens Kullfelt. This was not carried out as Kings Bay's board insisted on retaining its independence. Various companies were interested in leasing part of Ny-Åleund, including Norsk Polar Navigasjon, and various fishery groups, although no agreements were struck. Kings Bay had no permanent employees by 1970, but resumed operation of Ny-Ålesund in 1974. Bjørnøen, which previously operated a mine on Bjørnøya, received a common administration and board with Kings Bay from 1975. By 1977 Kings Bay stuck a deal by the then state-owned Store Norske to sell all its claims, although it kept the property rights around Ny-Ålesund.

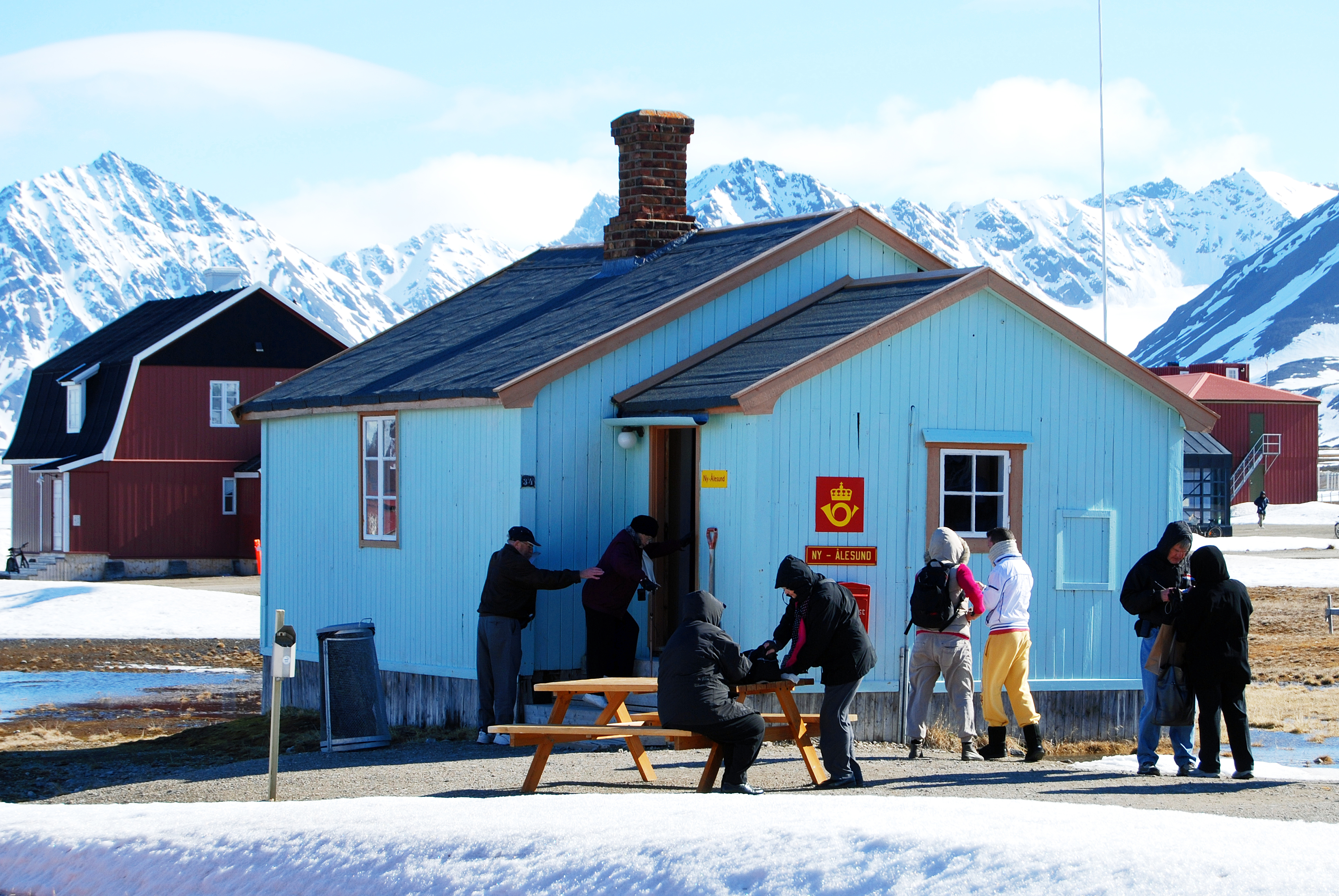
Tourists visit the world's northernmost post office

During the first winter there were five people who stayed the winter. Research expeditions were carried out by the Norwegian Polar Institute, typically with twenty people. Also the University of Cambridge and the University of Trondheim sent annual expeditions of a similar size. An early scientific agent was the Norwegian Institute for Air Research, which has conducted air research in Ny-Ålesund since the mid-1970s. The most prominent project was the Man and the Biosphere Project, which later also saw participation from the University of Tromsø and the University of Bergen and lasted until 1985. Additional international universities started sending expeditions in the latter half of the 1970s, such as the Max Planck Institute, Louisiana State University and the Danish Space Research Institute. The number of guest days for researchers and students reached 2,059 in 1980. A radio line repeater was installed at Kongsvegpasset in 1980, resulting in Ny-Ålesund receiving a telephone connection.

Kings Bay also generated revenue from selling fuel, supplies and air transport to shrimp fishers. From the 1970s the Coast Guard started calling regularly at Ny-Ålesund to assist in the transport of scientific instruments. During the early 1980s a plan for cultural heritage management was developed, which included the renovation of several older houses. Members of the Norwegian Railway Club restored a train which was put on display. Ny-Ålesund Town and Mine Museum opened in 1988. Very little of the town was listed with the initial pre-1900 conservation rules from 1974, but from 1992 larger parts were listed following automatic listing of all pre-1945 human traces. There had also since the 1970s been irregular visits by artists. From 1986 a building was refurbished to allow for an artist to stay there at any time. By 1985 there were sixteen universities with scientific activities. In 1987 the University of Tromsø built a scientific greenhouse next to the school and by 1987 Kings Bay had twenty people working in Ny-Ålesund during the summer.

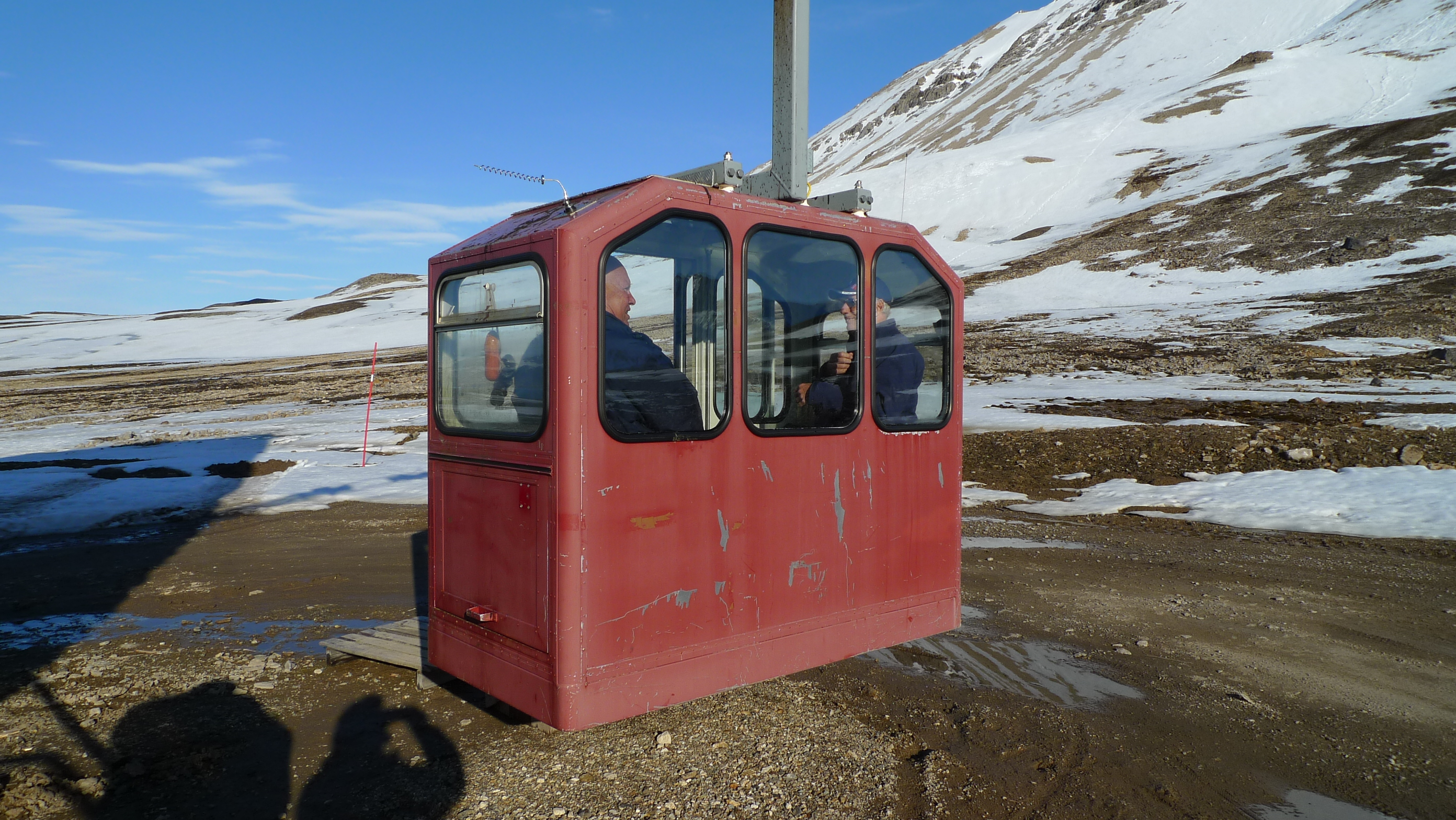
Construction of the gondola to Zeppelinfjellet started in 1988

Preparation of the Norwegian Polar Institute's Zeppelin Station commenced in 1988, which included the construction of an aerial tramway. Kings Bay moved its head office from Oslo to Ny-Ålesund in 1990. New laboratories were built for the Natural Environment Research Council, the Alfred Wegener Institute and SINTEF in 1990 and 1991. From 1990 the Norwegian Mapping Authority moved into the old telemetry station and the following year Japan's National Institute of Polar Research moved into a renovated building at Hamnerabben. Lufttransport started serving the community with fixed-wing aircraft instead of helicopters. A 1992 government report concluded that Svalbard should focus on becoming an international research community, and the authorities started permitting foreign research institutes to establish permanents stations in Ny-Ålesund. Kings Bay sold 7,521 guest days in 1991, 1,720 of which were to researchers.

The docks received a total renovation in 1992 for NOK 18 million, allowing cruise ships to dock in port. The following year a 60-person café was completed. The Norwegian Mapping Authority completed its continental drift station in 1994, at the same time as a satellite communication link opened on Zeppelinfjellet. By 1996 there were over one hundred research projects in Ny-Ålesund, and the town reaches a capacity for 200 people two years later. On 6 May 1998, Kings Bay Kull. Comp A/S changes its name to Kings Bay AS. The same summer the North Pole Hotel was finished refurbished and opened as the world's northernmost hotel. That year also saw the annual number of researcher-days exceed 15,000. In March 1999 the Norwegian Polar Institute opened its new 700-square-meter (7,500 sq ft) Sverdrup Station. The original building on Zeppelinfjellet was demolished and replaced with a new facility.

The Norwegian Mapping Authority closed its operations in Ny-Ålesund in June 2004, although China opened its Arctic Yellow River Station the following month. In August Kongsfjorden was preserved to only allow it to be used for research, hindering fishing vessels from entering the bay. India opened its Himadri Station in July 2008.

== See also ==
- Ny-Sunnmøre

== Bibliography ==
- Hanoa, Rolf (1993). Kings Bay Kull Comp. A/S 1917–1992 (in Norwegian). Oslo: Schibsted. ISBN 82-516-1448-1.
- Kriege, J.; Russo, A. (April 2000). "A History of the European Space Agency 1958–1987: Volume I The story of ESRO and ELDO, 1958–1973" (PDF). European Space Agency. Archived (PDF) from the original on 2 March 2012.
- Tamnes, Rolf (1992). Svalbard og den politiske avmakt (in Norwegian). Oslo: Norwegian Institute for Defence Studies.
- Thusesen, Nils Petter (2005). Svalbards historie i årstall (in Norwegian). Oslo: Orion. ISBN 82-458-0742-7.
- Ulfstein, Geir (1995). The Svalbard Treaty. Scandinavian University Press. ISBN 8200227138.
- Øvregard, Per (1996). Televerket: I samfunnets tjeneste (in Norwegian). Vol. 2. Norsk Telemuseum. ISBN 8291335109.
