= Prins Heinrichøya =

Island in Svalbard, Norway

Coordinates: 78.9214°N 11.9806°E

Prins Heinrichøya, Kongsfjorden

Prins Heinrichøya is an island in Zeppelinhamna at the southern side of Kongsfjorden in Oscar II Land, at Spitsbergen, Svalbard. It is named after Prince Heinrich of Prussia. Prins Heinrichøya, as well as the seven Lovénøyane, Mietheholmen and Eskjeret were included in the Kongsfjorden Bird Sanctuary in 1973.
