= Lovénøyane =

Island group in Svalbard, Norway

Coordinates: 78.9273°N 12.2827°E

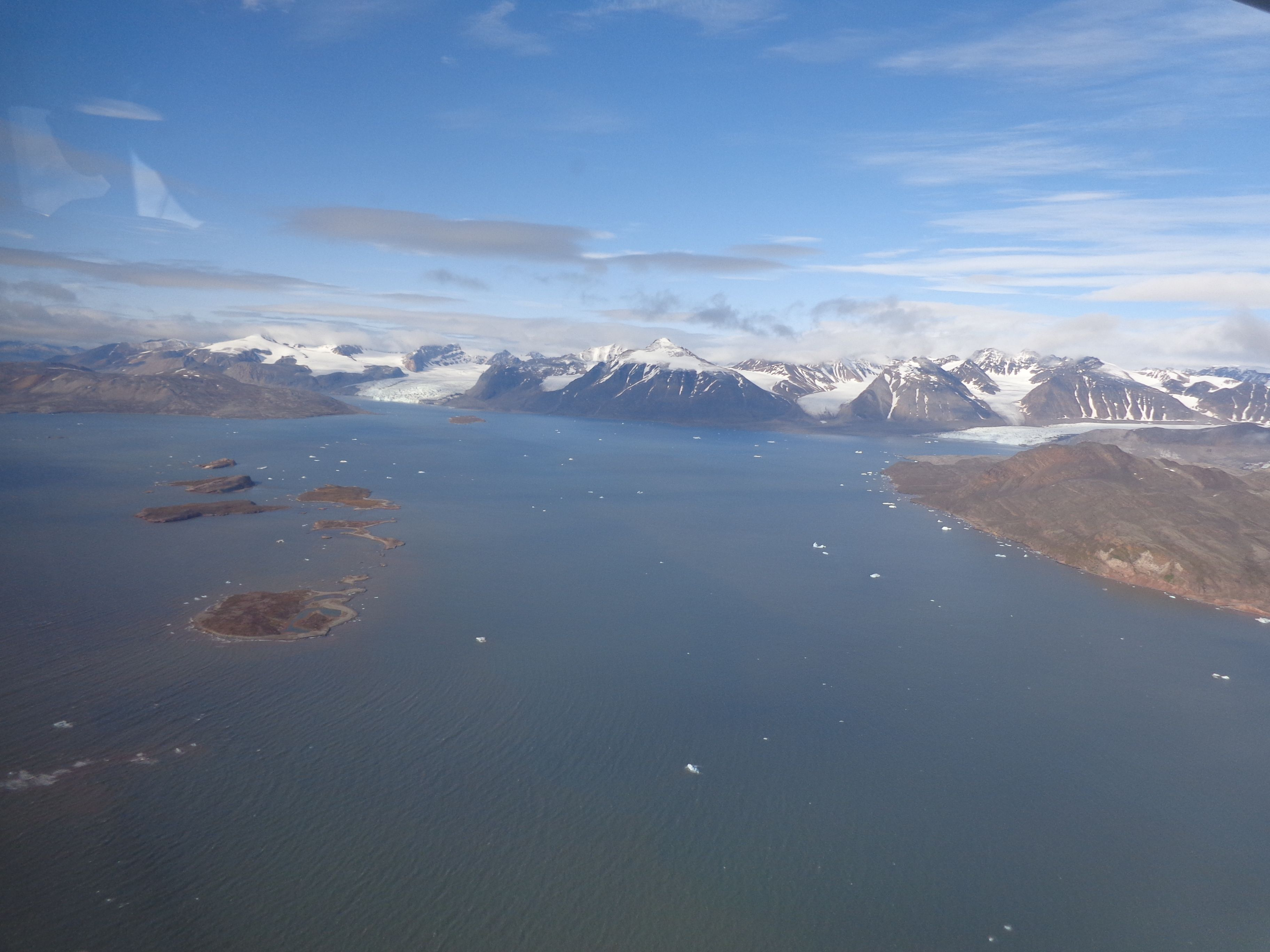
Lovénøyane on the left side of the oblique aerial photograph of Kongsfjorden

Lovénøyane is a group of seven islands and islets in Kongsfjorden in Haakon VII Land at Spitsbergen, Svalbard. They are named after Swedish zoologist Sven Ludvig Lovén. The largest of the islands is Storholmen, and the six others are Juttaholmen, Observasjonsholmen, Sigridholmen, Midtholmen, Innerholmen and Leirholmen.

Lovénøyane and the three islands Prins Heinrichøya, Mietheholmen and Eskjeret were included in the Kongsfjorden Bird Sanctuary in 1973.
