= Mainzodden =

Headland in Oscar II Land at Spitsbergen, Svalbard

Coordinates: 78.9255°N 11.9462°E

Mainzodden is a headland in Oscar II Land at Spitsbergen, Svalbard. It is located in Ny-Ålesund at the southwestern side of Kongsfjorden, and marks the northern extension of the bay Zeppelinhamna.
