= Kongsfjord Telemetry Station =

Earth station in Svalbard, Norway

Coordinates: 78.930°N 11.855°E

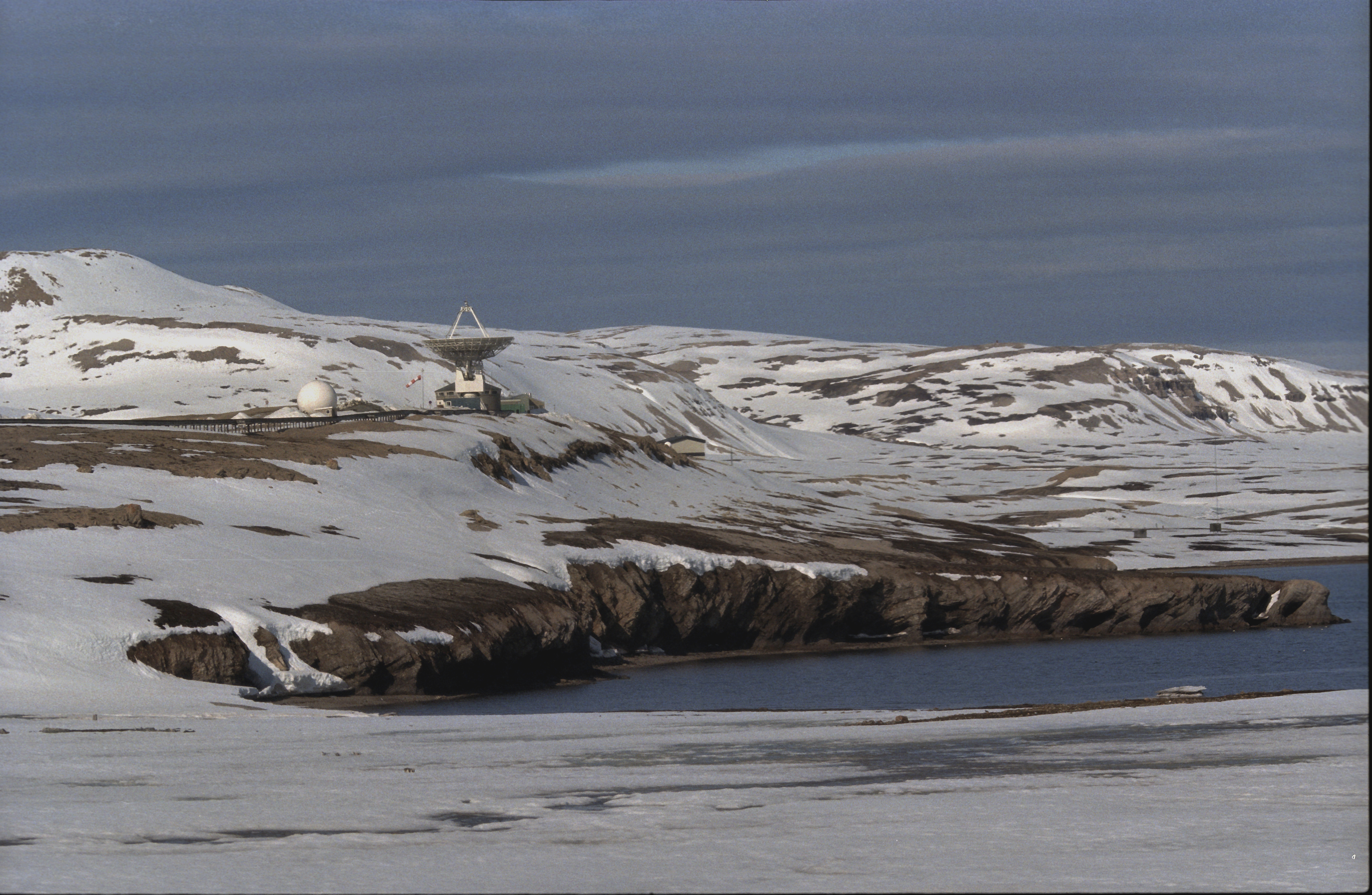
The station was located at the far end of Ny-Ålesund Airport, Hamnerabben (left). One of the radomes is visible.

Kongsfjord Telemetry Station (Norwegian: Kongsfjord telemetristasjon) was a satellite ground station located nearby Ny-Ålesund in Svalbard, Norway. It was used between 1967 and 1974 as one of the four initial ground stations which were part of the European Space Tracking Network (ESTRACK) serving the European Space Research Organization's (ESRO) first generation of satellites. The station provided radio tracking, telemetry and commanding services as well as data download. Although owned by ESRO, the facilities were constructed and operated by the Royal Norwegian Council for Scientific and Industrial Research (NTNF).

Plans for the station's construction started in the early 1960s and negotiations between ESRO and Norwegian authorities started in 1964, despite Norway's lack of membership in ESRO. An initial disagreement of whether to locate the facility by Ny-Ålesund or Longyearbyen was overcome, and an agreement was signed on 14 December 1964. However, it was followed up by numerous protests from the Soviet Union, which claimed the installation would violate the demilitarized zone clause of the Svalbard Treaty, as the station had the potential to be used for military satellites and intelligence. The protests were rejected by Norwegian authorities, and construction started in May 1965. The Soviet Union attempted several inspections; one resulted in the crash of a Soviet helicopter. Operations commenced in 1967, but the facility was closed in 1974 as the facility was not suitable for new satellites with higher orbits.

== History ==
=== Background ===
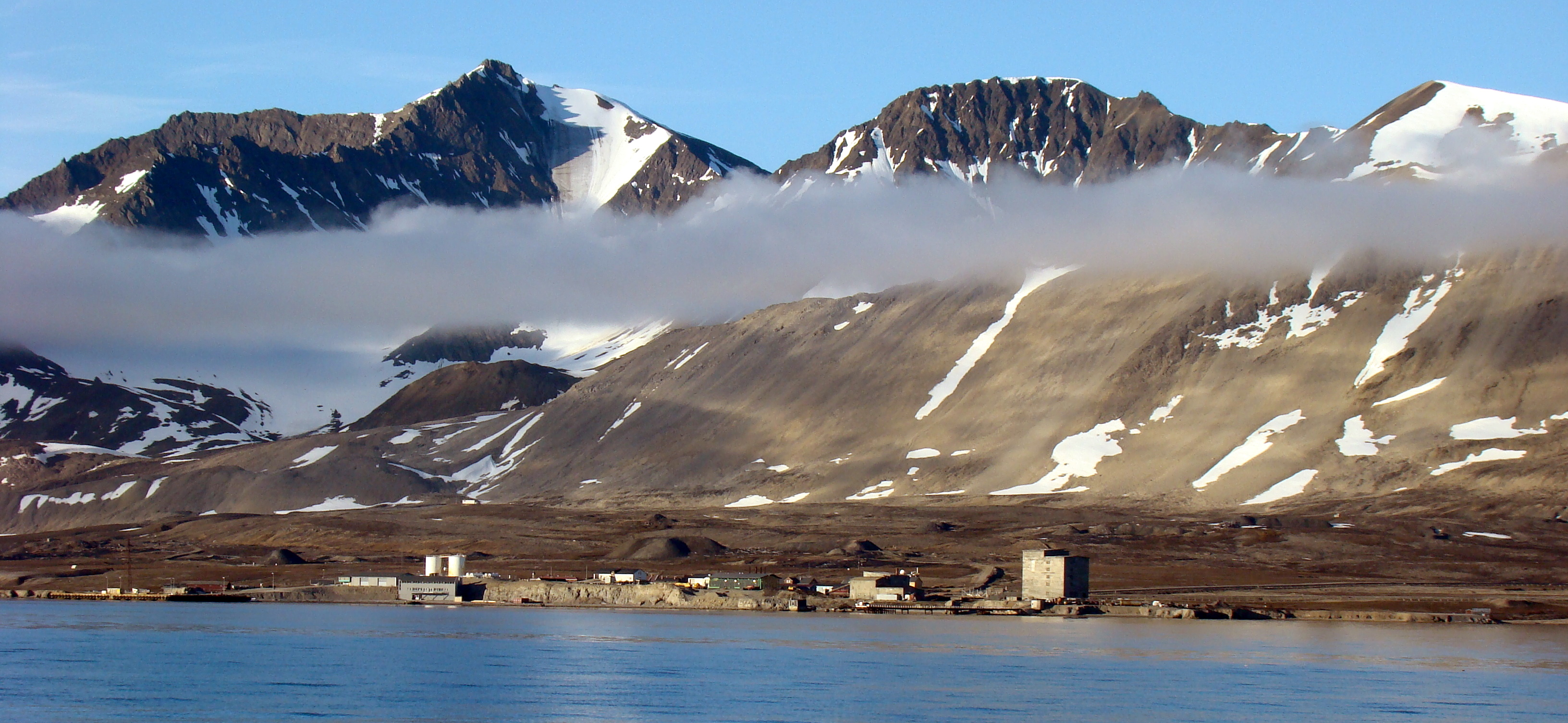
Kongsfjord Telemetry Station was located in Ny-Ålesund

The first official inquiries into establishing ionosphere research in Svalbard was taken by Leiv Harang, then head of the Norwegian Defence Research Establishment (FFI), in October 1950. Two similar facilities, a completed one at Kjeller and one under construction in Tromsø, had already been initiated. The proposal, regarded by Harang as primarily a military project, was initially issued to the United States. It was considered by US Joint Chiefs of Staff, who saw it as a possible excuse to populate Spitsbergen as a counter-measure to the Soviet mining communities. However, nothing came of the plans before the International Geophysical Year in 1957–58, when an ionosphere research station was established as Isfjord Radio and moved to Ny-Ålesund in 1963. Although unrelated to the telemetry station, this was the initiation of technology services in Ny-Ålesund.

In 1960, Norway entered a cooperation with the United States, which resulted in the construction of the Norwegian Space Centre at Andøya. In 1964, ESRO was established as a Western European reaction to the rapidly developing Soviet and American space programs. Norway chose to only join as an observer, partially because of the close cooperation with the US and partially because of the cost. However, Norwegian space research scientists participated in ESRO programs.

Preliminary work in the planning of ESRO operations concluded that the ESTRACK network would initially consist of four radio tracking and telemetry stations and three optical tracking stations. In addition to Svalbard, tracking and telemetry stations were built on the Falkland Islands, in Fairbanks, Alaska and in Redu, Belgium. France actively opposed the Svalbard location, as Norway was not a member of ESRO. The ESRO secretariat wanted to quicken the location decision, as it was necessary to have all four in operation before the launch of the ESRO-1 and ESRO-2 satellites.

The initial proposal had called for locating the station in Ny-Ålesund due to its topographical advantage. In January 1964, ESRO started informal discussions with the Norwegian Ministry of Foreign Affairs, who stated that they had no initial objections. By then, supported by Store Norske Spitsbergen Kulkompani, ESRO instead proposed situating the station at Longyearbyen because it was less remote and would incur lower costs. This was opposed by Norwegian authorities; mining in Ny-Ålesund had ceased after the 1963 Kings Bay Affair and the authorities wanted permanent activity in the town. An official request was made by ESRO in February, and in May, official political support for the project was awarded. The main motivation was to establish a permanent space technology center in Norway that could stimulate further scientific growth.

=== Soviet protests ===
The Svalbard Treaty establishes Svalbard as both a free economic zone and a demilitarized zone, allowing a Soviet presence but hindering Norway from installing military fortifications. The Soviet Union objected to the creation of the telemetry program and threatened to establish a counter-station. The basis was that the ground station was seen as having a military potential, that most ESRO members were also members of North Atlantic Treaty Organization (NATO) and that Norway lacked sufficient competence to control whether or not military activities would take place at the station. Norwegian authorities responded that the installation was to be used for scientific and peaceful activities under Norwegian control. Further, because of treaty only prohibited fortifications and not military activity as such, Norway held the right to conduct military scientific research and operate intelligence operations on the archipelago.

To minimize Soviet opposition, Norway attempted to move the debate from the political to the specialist scene, while at the same time establishing a protocol for Norwegian control and operation of the facility. To achieve this, Norwegian authorities worked towards establishing an inspection procedure to insure that the facilities remained solely used for 'peaceful activities'. This would particularly focus on the regular inspection of auxiliary equipment. To depoliticize the issue further, the government appointed the semi-independent NTNF as the operator of the facility. The first oral consultations between the Soviet embassy and the Norwegian government took place in November 1964.

In the Norwegian Government's internal evaluation, FFI stated that as long as regular inspections were carried out, there was little chance of military use of the installations, in particular because of the limited technical equipment which would be installed. The Norwegian Intelligence Service held a different opinion, and stated that if the right equipment was installed, the ground station could be used to listen to information from Soviet satellites in the area and that it would require a very competent inspector to find such equipment. Allowing Soviet inspectors access to the station was discussed politically, but this was quickly discarded as it would establish an unwanted precedent and would undermine the Norwegian sovereignty of the archipelago.

Discussions between ESRO and Norwegian authorities continued, with ESRO pressing for a quick decision, while Norway was stalling the negotiations. This was carried out to allow time to develop solid counter-policy against the Soviet Union as well as to gain support for the installation to be located at Kongsfjorden outside Ny-Ålesund. On the other hand, ESRO threatened to instead build the installation in northern Sweden and northern Canada and abandon the Svalbard plans. An agreement was reached between ESRO, Norwegian authorities and NTNF was on 14 December 1964. It established both the location and that NTNF would be Norway's party. The agreement allowed the station to be located in Ny-Ålesund in exchange for Norwegian authorities building and operating the facility. While ESRO accepted NTNF as the Norwegian party, they wanted to receive a guarantee from the Norwegian authorities. However, to minimize Soviet criticism, the ministry was not interested in giving direct guarantees and asked that ESRO solely negotiate with NTNF.

The official Soviet protest was issued on 17 February 1965 in a letter to the Norwegian government. Specifically, it stated that Norway would be violating Article 9 of the Svalbard Treaty, that the installation could be used for intelligence assessment and that Norway should have consulted the Soviet Union before making the decision. The issue was discussed by the Norwegian Cabinet of State six days later. Minister of Justice and acting Minister of Foreign Affairs Oscar Christian Gundersen regarded the protest as moderate and that it fell into a series of Soviet protests against any activity on Svalbard that could remotely be considered a potential cover-up for military activity. An official response was sent on 23 March, which rejected all the Soviet objections. It stated that Norwegian authorities had made agreements with ESRO that Norway would make sufficient inspections to insure that Article 9 was followed, it pointed out the open and civil nature of ESRO and rejected the Soviet claims that they had the right to be consulted in advance.

Norwegian Prime Minister Einar Gerhardsen visited the Soviet Union in May 1965, in which Soviet Premier Alexei Kosygin warned against the installation and stated that the Soviet Union would build a counter-station. In June, the Soviet Consul in Barentsburg came on an inspection to the installation, and on 2 July a Soviet helicopter crashed at the construction site after having, presumably unintentionally, touched a mast. Soviet demands to have permanent Soviet inspectors of the facility were rejected. The Svalbard Treaty does not include any verification procedure, and as such no signatories have the right to conduct inspections.

After the station opened, Soviet protests persisted. The issue was raised at official visits to the Soviet Union by Norwegian politicians in 1966, 1967 and 1968. The Soviet Consul in Barentsburg visited Ny-Ålesund in 1968 and attempted to make inspections of the installation. On 28 August 1968, Norway and the Soviet Union agreed for a one-time, two-day Soviet inspection of the station. The last protest against the installation was made in April 1969.

=== Construction and operation ===
The agreement with ESRO was approved by the Parliament of Norway on 9 July 1965 and the final contract was signed on 13 August. It included clauses that secured non-members access to use the station if there was sufficient capacity, that Norwegian authorities were granted all necessary information about the installation's use, and that NTNF would approve all auxiliary installations.

For NTNF, the establishment brought by an organizational change. While it had previously also conducted space research, the operations of installations had been placed with FFI. As FFI was a branch of the military, this structure could not be used in Svalbard. Thus NTNF had to organize an operative branch for the ground station. The responsibility for operating the telecommunications facilities was awarded to the Norwegian Telecommunications Administration. The ground station needed a computer. FFI offered to deliver a Simulation for Automatic Machinery, while the alternative was to purchase a PDP-8 computer from Digital Equipment Corporation. As NTNF was responsible for the country's technological development, they chose to award the contract to FFI on the condition that they pay for a PDP-8 if they were not able to deliver a computer themselves.

Construction started in May 1965 and NTNF planned to use as much of the mining company Kings Bay's facilities as they could. NTNF was allowed to use buildings as needed for free. In exchange, NTNF maintained the entire village and paid insurance on the buildings they used. Movable property used by NTNF was bought for a moderate price. NTNF had to build several new buildings in addition to utilities such as power cables and water, sewer and heating pipes. The new pipes had to be installed after the previous pipes, installed in 1956, had been subject to frost burst. Instead of building the pipes in a culvert, they were instead placed in wooded boxes above ground. During the summer of 1965, 65 people were working on construction, although it fell to between 40 and 45 during the winter. The following winter, only five people overwintered.

To allow ease of access and in case of emergencies, an ad hoc airport was built. Originally, Ny-Ålesund Airport, Hamnerabben was simply a section of the road between the radomes and the settlement which was 850 meters (2,790 ft) long and 40 meters (130 ft) wide. The gravel was bound with waste oil and with gates at each end. To allow traffic to operate as usual during use, a small bypass road was also built.

A royal decree on 26 October 1967 established an Oslo-based chief inspector who was to inspect the facility at least once per year, and a local inspector who would inspect the facility at least once per week. The Norwegian Telecommunications Administration's assistant director of radio technology, Per Mortensen, was appointed chief inspector, while the manager of Ny-Ålesund's coast radio station was appointed assistant inspector. The ground station and auxiliary facilities were ready for operation in 1967. Through its history, the station had five managers: Henning Nielsen (1965–67), Roald Søfteland (1967–68), Ewald Øyen (1968–70), Einar Enderud (1970–72) and Kristian Sneltvedt (1972–74).

After the initial ESRO program was initiated, the agency moved towards satellites with a higher orbital eccentricity and escape orbits. The facilities in Ny-Ålesund were unsuitable for telemetry with such satellites, as they would operate at a different frequency, the size of the antenna dish was too small and the ground station's geographical position was out of range. Because of the change of ESRO's focus, the need for a telemetry station on Svalbard disappeared after the termination of ESRO's initial program, and the facility was closed in 1974.

Since the closing of the mines in 1963, the mining company Kings Bay had been working to establish Ny-Ålesund as a research town. The telemetry station acted as an important stepping stone for research activity, and the plans for development of Ny-Ålesund as a permanent research community continued past 1974. In 1997, Svalbard Satellite Station opened in Longyearbyen, which is among other stations used by ESTRACK.

== Facilities ==
The ground station was located at Rabben, also known as Hamnerabben, a hill 2 kilometers (1.2 mi) west of the settlement in Ny-Ålesund, at the far end of the airport. It consisted of a 360-square-meter (3,900 sq ft) one-story operations center and two antennas. The largest antenna, used for sending, had a diameter of 21-meter (69 ft), while the receiving antenna had a diameter of 17 meters (56 ft). Each was placed on a 4-meter (13 ft) cubed, 25 tonnes (25 long tons; 28 short tons) concrete foundation and surrounded with a plastic radome. Both antennas were automated to ensure that they were aimed at the satellite when they were in use. The receiving antenna was used both to download information about the satellites' condition and surroundings, as well as data download, which was stored on magnetic tape. The uplink was used to give the satellites orders.

Kongsfjord Telemetry Station constituted one of the four initial ESTRACK ground stations which provided radio tracking and telemetry communication with ESRO's low Earth orbit satellites. The ground station communicated with the satellites in the 136–137 MHz band. This was optimal for low-orbit satellites, allowed for a small antenna dish but gave a low bit rate. The various satellites using the facility conducted measurements of solar radiation, cosmic radiation, the polar ionosphere, and ionizing and dynamic effects regarding electric currents and magnetic disturbances.

The facility had a Simulation for Automatic Machinery computer built by FFI which allowed for real-time operations with the data. Telecommunications systems were operated by the Norwegian Telecommunications Administration, which established a two-way radio station at Ny-Ålesund. Communication from the satellites was relayed by radio to Ski and onwards with a leased line to the European Space Operations Centre in Darmstadt, Germany. Return information was relayed via a radio station at Jeløy. Magnetic tapes were sent to Darmstadt every other week, first via aircraft to Longyearbyen and then onwards to Germany. NTNF hired a nurse and had the Amundsen House refitted as a clinic for the duration of the telemetry station's operation.
