= Gluudneset =

Headland in Spitsbergen, Svalbard

Coordinates: 78.9148°N 12.0701°E

Gluudneset is a headland in Oscar II Land at Spitsbergen, Svalbard. It is located south of Ny-Ålesund at the southwestern side of Kongsfjorden, and marks the southern extension of the bay Zeppelinhamna.
