= Gjerstadfjellet =

Mountain in Svalbard, Norway

Coordinates: 78.7430°N 13.1694°E

Gjerstadfjellet is a mountain in Oscar II Land at Spitsbergen, Svalbard. It has a height of 1,012 m.a.s.l. and is located south of the glacier Kongsvegen, west of Kongsvegpasset. The mountain is named after Arctic explorer Magnus Gjerstad.
