= Kongsvegpasset =

Mountain pass in northern Norway

Coordinates: 78.7349°N 13.4249°E

Kongsvegpasset is a glaciated mountain pass at Spitsbergen, Svalbard, between Oscar II Land, Haakon VII Land and James I Land. It divides the three glaciers Sveabreen, Osbornebreen and Kongsvegen, at an altitude of about 750 meter. An aircraft beacon is installed at the site. Nearby mountains are the nunataks Vegvaktaren, Gjerstadfjellet and Centralen. North of the pass is the mountain Kongsvegsåta.
