= Zeppelinhamna =

Cove in Svalbard, Norway

Coordinates: 78.9182°N 11.9815°E

Zeppelinhamna is a cove at the northern side of the peninsula Brøggerhalvøya in Oscar II Land at Spitsbergen, Svalbard. It extends between the points Mainzodden and Gluudneset, and the island Prins Heinrichøya is located in the bay. The cove is named after German airships designer Ferdinand von Zeppelin.
