= Kongsvegsåta =

Mountain in Svalbard, Norway

Coordinates: 78.804°N 13.470°E

Kongsvegsåta is a mountain at Spitsbergen, Svalbard. It is located north of Kongsvegpasset, between Oscar II Land and Haakon VII Land, and has a height of 1,110 m.a.s.l.
