= Kronebreen =

Tidewater glacier located at the western side of Spitsbergen, Svalbard

Coordinates: 78°50′N 13°00′E

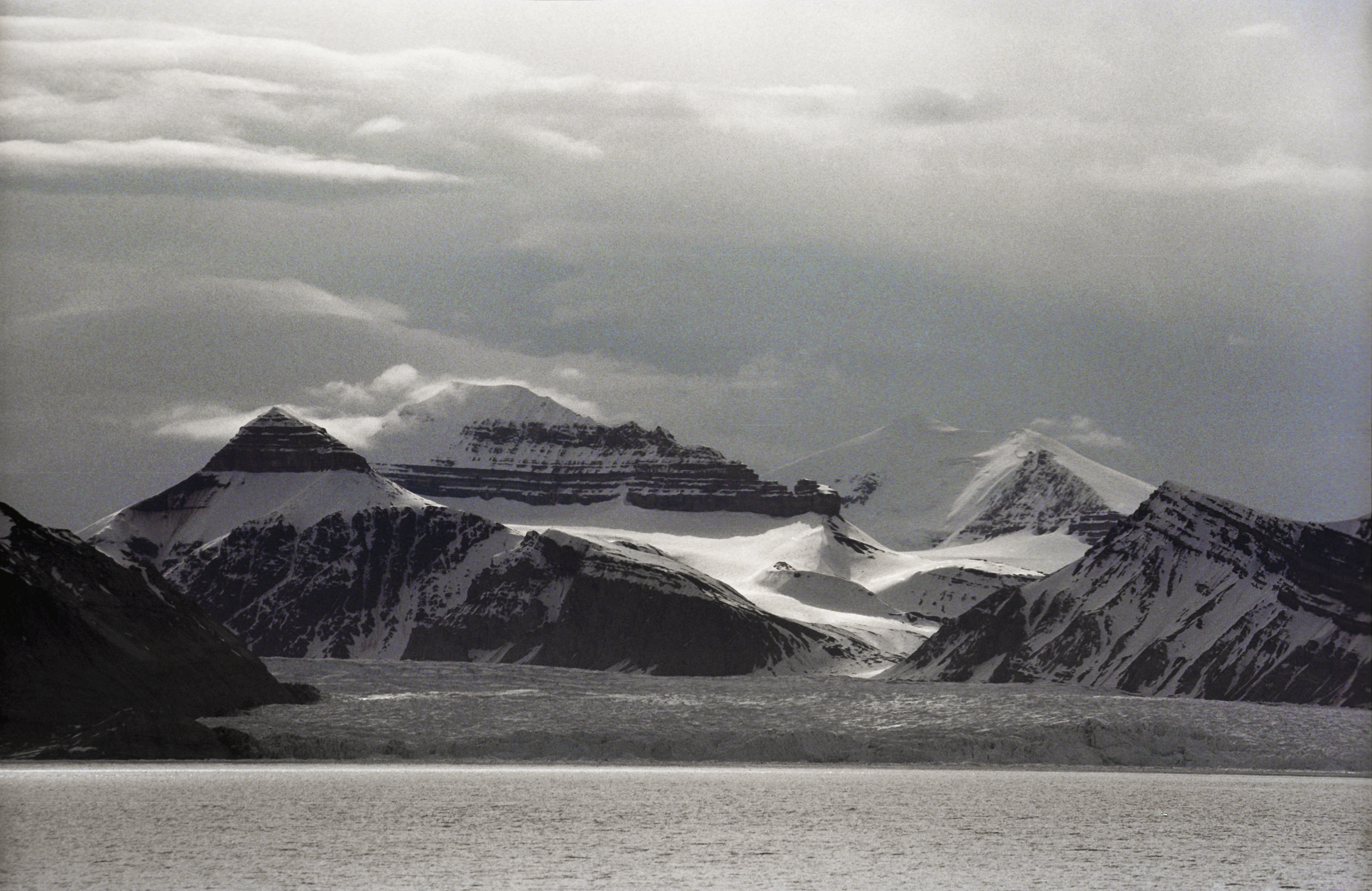
The terminus of Kronebreen and Kongsvegen glaciers, in the inner parts of Kongsfjorden

Kronebreen is a tidewater glacier located at the western side of Spitsbergen, Svalbard. It is one of the largest glaciers on Svalbard, draining about 690 square kilometers. The glacier moves with an average speed of two meters per day.

Kronebreen merges with Kongsvegen glacier close to the terminus, and the two glaciers reach the ocean in Kongsfjorden.
