= Leiv Harang =

Norwegian physicist

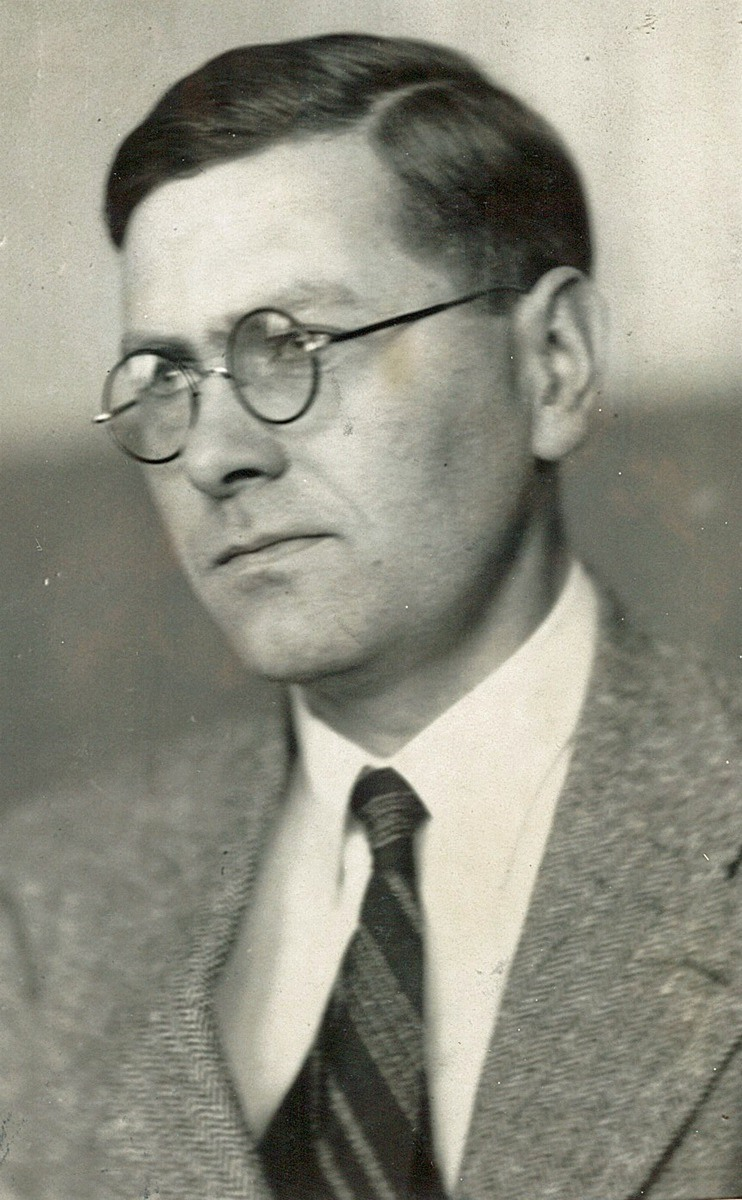
Leiv in the 1930s.

Leiv Harang (19 April 1902 – 21 September 1970) was a Norwegian physicist. He was born in Trondheim. His speciality was the northern lights. He was the first manager of the Tromsø Geophysical Observatory, established in 1928 for the study of aurora borealis phenomena. In 1946 he discovered the phenomenon later called the Harang Discontinuity. In 1946 he was among the founders of the Norwegian Defence Research Establishment. From 1952 he was professor at the University of Oslo.
