= Kongsfjorden Bird Sanctuary =

Protected area in Svalbard, Norway

- Kongsfjorden fuglereservat
- IUCN category Ia (strict nature reserve)
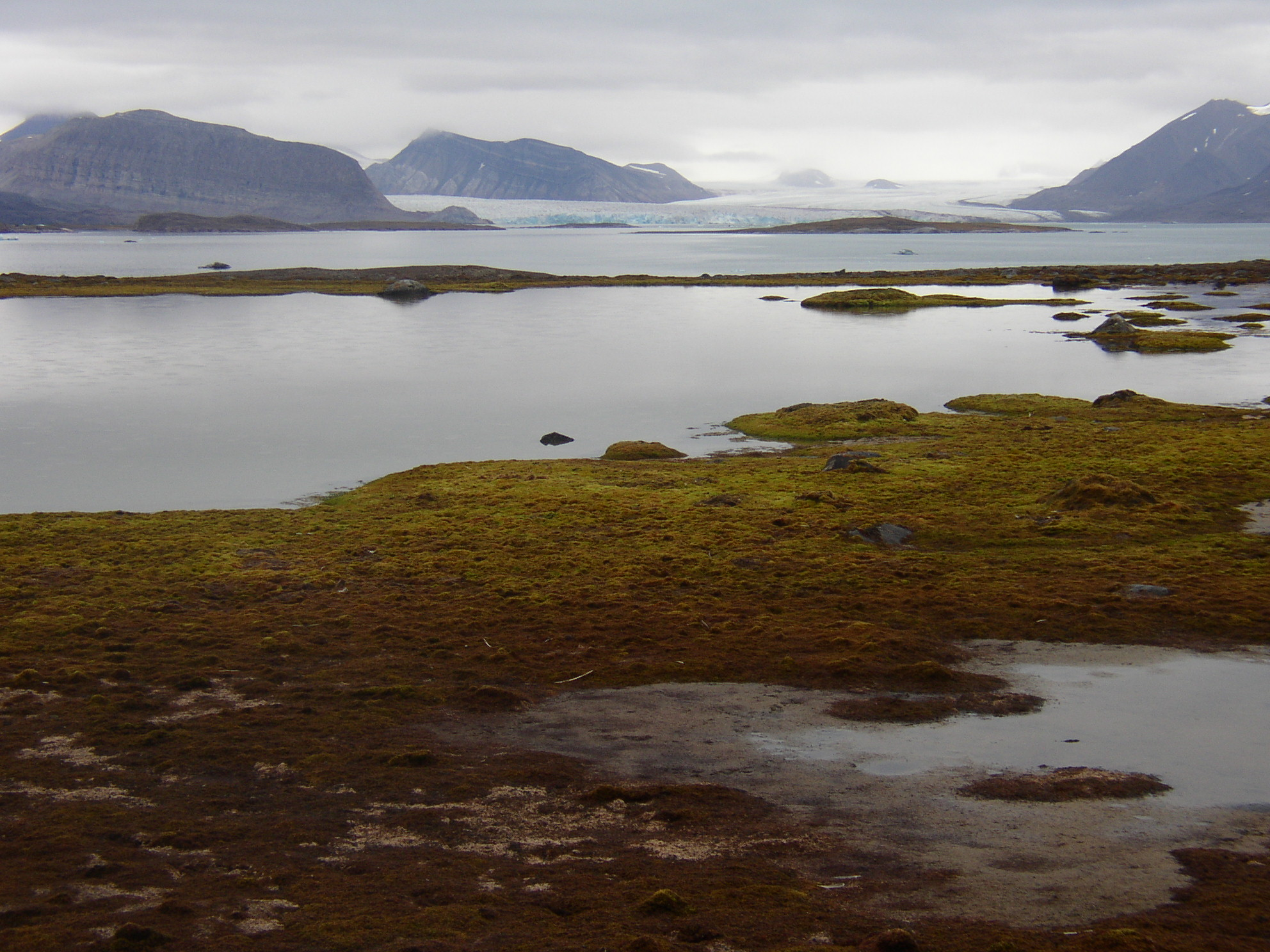
- Kongsfjorden viewed from Blomstrandhalvøya
- Interactive map of Kongsfjorden Bird Sanctuary
- Location: Spitsbergen, Svalbard, Norway
- Nearest town: Ny-Ålesund
- Coordinates: 78°55′N 12°10′E
- Area: 7.1 km^{2} (2.7 sq mi), of which 1.4 km^{2} (0.54 sq mi) is land
- Established: July 1, 1973
- Governing body: Norwegian Directorate for Nature Management

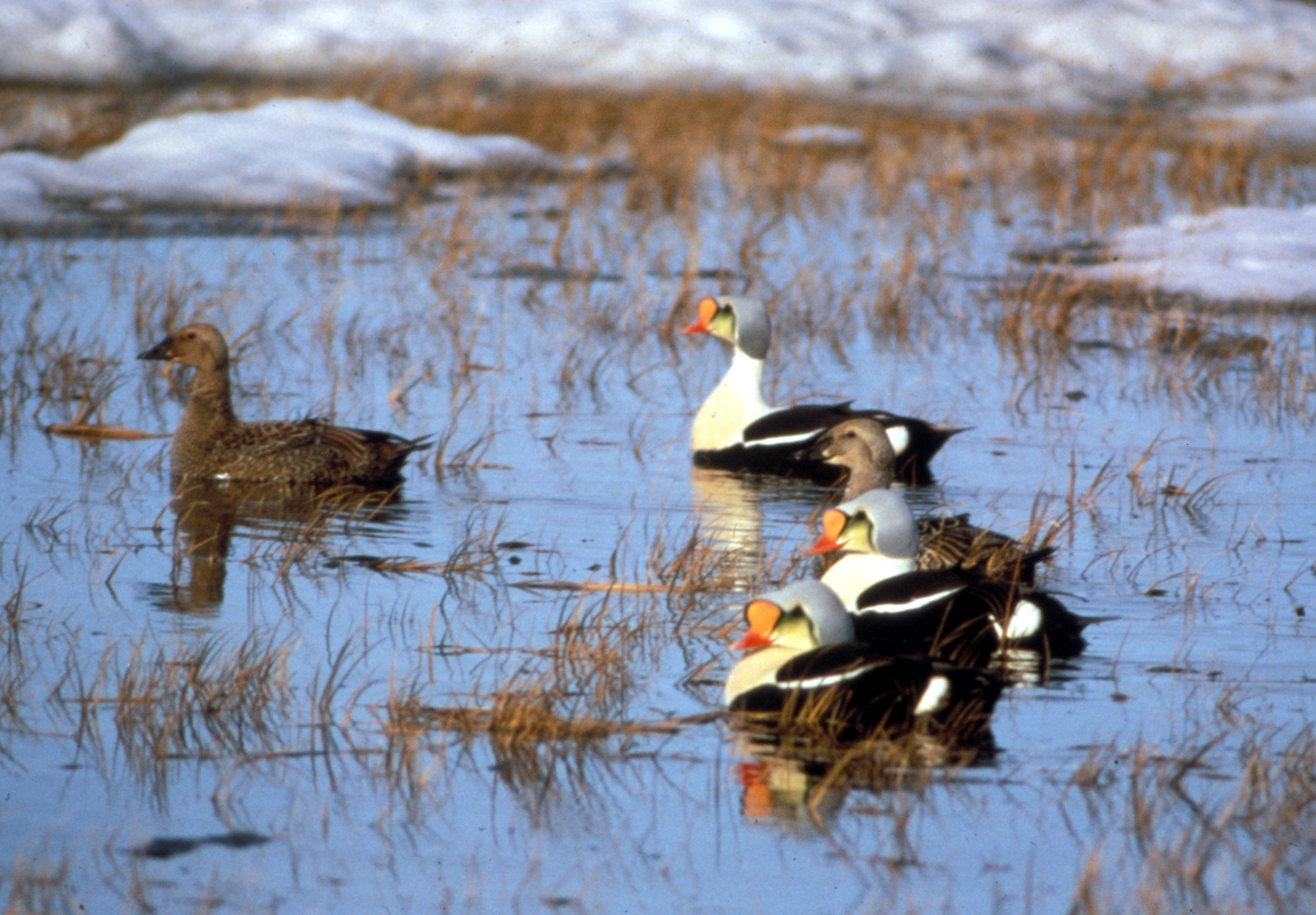
The sanctuary is an important breeding site for King Eiders

Kongsfjorden Bird Sanctuary (Norwegian: Kongsfjorden fuglereservat) is a 140 ha bird reserve at Svalbard, Norway, established in 1973. It includes islands and islets in Kongsfjorden, Haakon VII Land. It lies at the inner end of the fjord and consists of about ten islands, mainly covered with grassy vegetation and having small freshwater ponds. The fjord is surrounded by steep mountains, cliffs, glaciers and tundra. The reserve has been recognised as a wetland of international importance by designation under the Ramsar Convention. It has also been identified as an Important Bird Area (IBA) by BirdLife International. It supports breeding populations of pink-footed and barnacle geese, common and king eiders, long-tailed ducks, purple sandpipers, red phalaropes, glaucous gulls, long-tailed jaegers and snow buntings. Ivory gulls have been recorded.
