= Kongsvegen glacier =

Glacier in Svalbard

Coordinates: 78°49.0′N 12°46.6′E

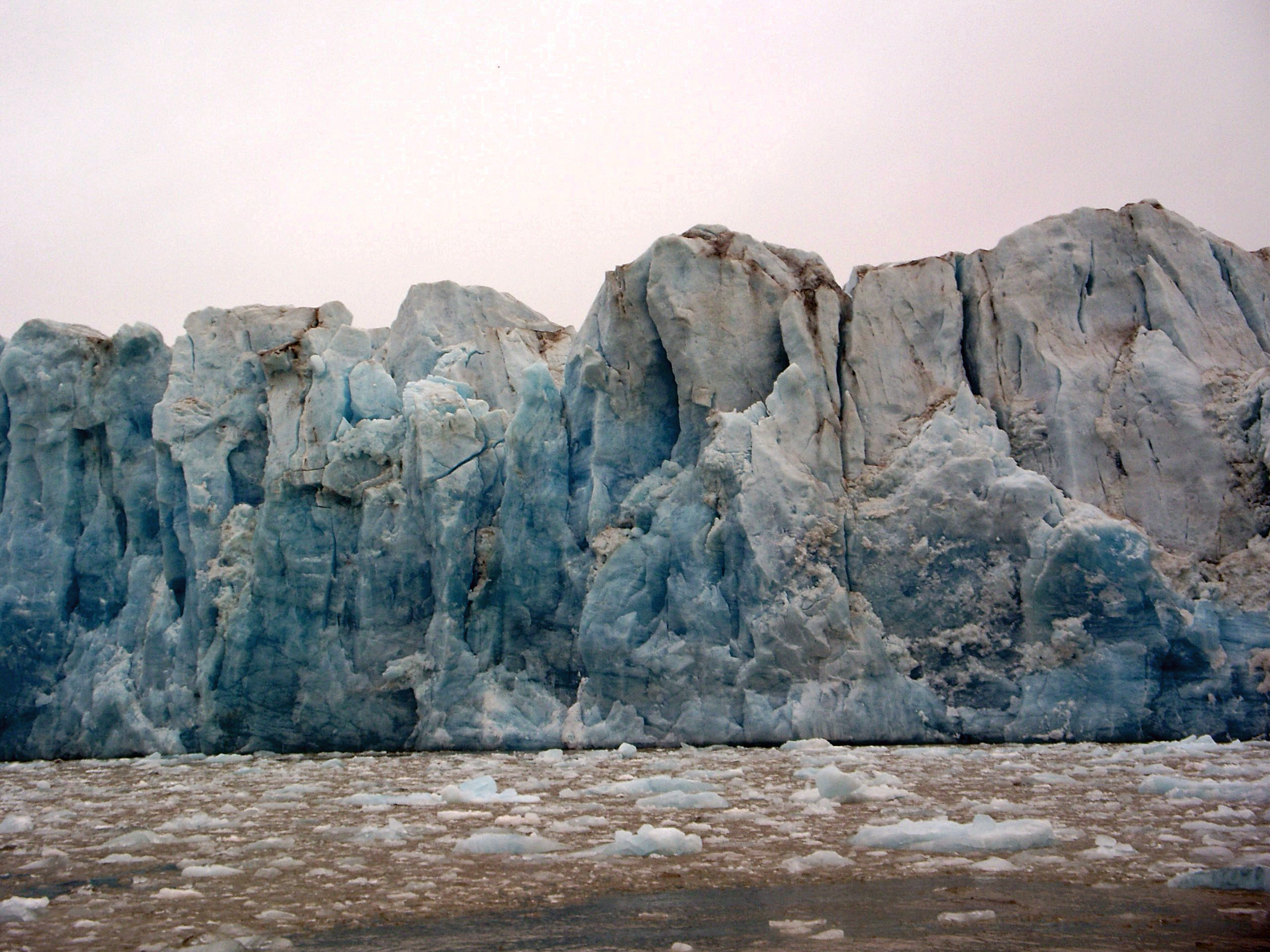
Glacier front of the Kongsvegen

The Kongsvegen is a glacier, located in west Spitsbergen, Svalbard, 1,250 kilometres (780 mi) north of the Norwegian mainland.

== Description ==
The glacier is of an outlet type with a sea calving terminus. It occupies 105 square kilometres (41 sq mi) of Spitsbergen, which is covered in glaciers for 80% of its land mass. The glacier is one of the most extensively studied in Spitsbergen and has been monitored for annual volume changes since 1987. Kongsvegen is 20 kilometres (12 mi) long and currently retreating in length, following a surge around 1948, although it has been growing in ice mass since 1987.

=== Movement ===
The Kongsvegen is classified as a polythermal glacier, with large variations in the temperature of the ice below. The ice near the surface (between 50 and 160 metres down (160-520 feet)) is very cold, and overlies a much warmer base of ice. This leads to increased mass flow and velocity over the summer months, usually because of the build-up of meltwater at the base, which lubricates the glacier in basal sliding. The glacier is of a surge type, meaning that its length and characteristics can vary rapidly over time, making the ice field very unpredictable. It also means the glacier can undergo rapid periods of advancing and retreating movement. From 1948 to 1977 the glacier retreated very quickly at rates of up to 800 metres per year after a large surge in its movement downstream. Kongsvegen has also experienced periods, as now, of relative stasis. At the moment Kongsvegen is retreating at 3 metres (10 feet) per year and has been doing so since 1990. This has allowed the glacier to build up its ice mass further upstream, while shrinking in length downstream, where the ice is thin from rapid movement.

== Terminus ==
The glacier finishes at its merger with another glacier, the Kronebreen, another surge glacier moving at around 750 metres per year, along a 4-kilometre (2.5 mi) ice front with dirty 5- to 20-metre-high ice cliffs, as the Kongsbreen picks up medial moraine and englacial debris.

== See also ==
- Plastic flow
