= Kongsfjorden =

Inlet on the west coast of Spitsbergen

Coordinates: 79°00′N 11°40′E

Designations

Ramsar Wetland
- Designated: 24 July 1985
- Reference no.: 315

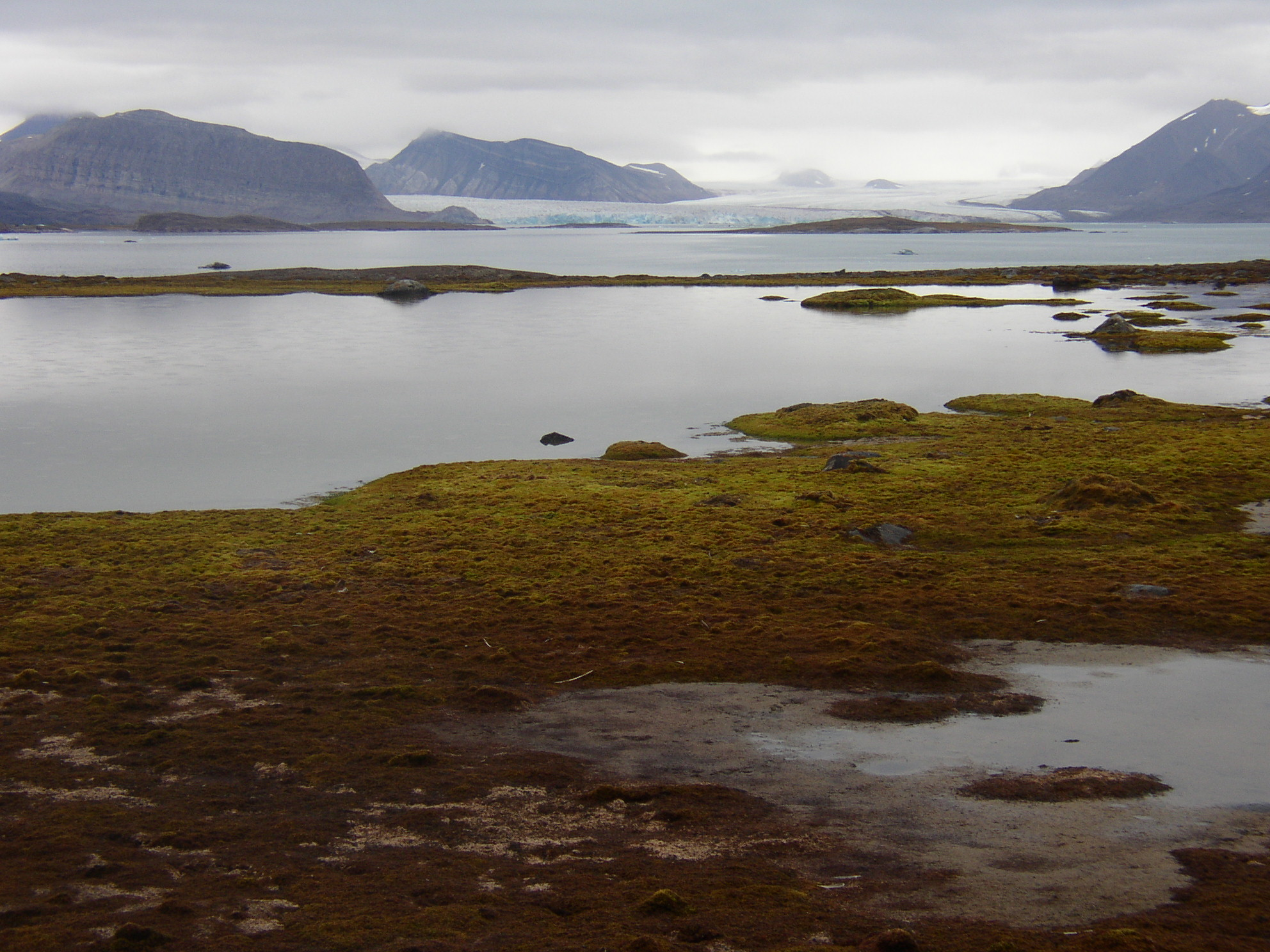
Kongsfjorden as seen from Blomstrandhalvøya

Kongsfjorden (Kongs Fjord or Kings Bay) is an inlet on the west coast of Spitsbergen, an island which is part of the Svalbard archipelago in the Arctic Ocean. The inlet is 26 km (16 mi) long and ranges in width from 6 to 14 km (3.7 to 8.7 mi). Two glaciers, Kronebreen and Kongsvegen, head the fjord.

The coal-mining town of Ny-Ålesund is located on its southern shore and is one of the few permanent settlements on Spitsbergen. It is also a popular shore break for cruise ships, although local scientists who monitor CO_{2} levels as part of their climate change research have voiced concerns that the excessive pollution generated by cruise ships is interfering with their measurements.

Kongsfjorden was originally named Deer Sound by Jonas Poole (1610), and was known as such by the English whalers until at least 1658. Giles and Rep (c. 1710) were the first to name it Koninks Bay. William Scoresby (1820) repeats this error by naming it Kings Bay, while he moves Deer Sound to a bay in the northeast of the fjord. Modern cartographers have simply repeated this error.
