= Ny-Ålesund Airport, Hamnerabben =

Airport in Svalbard, Norway

Ny-Ålesund Airport, Hamnerabben Ny-Ålesund flyplass, Hamnerabben
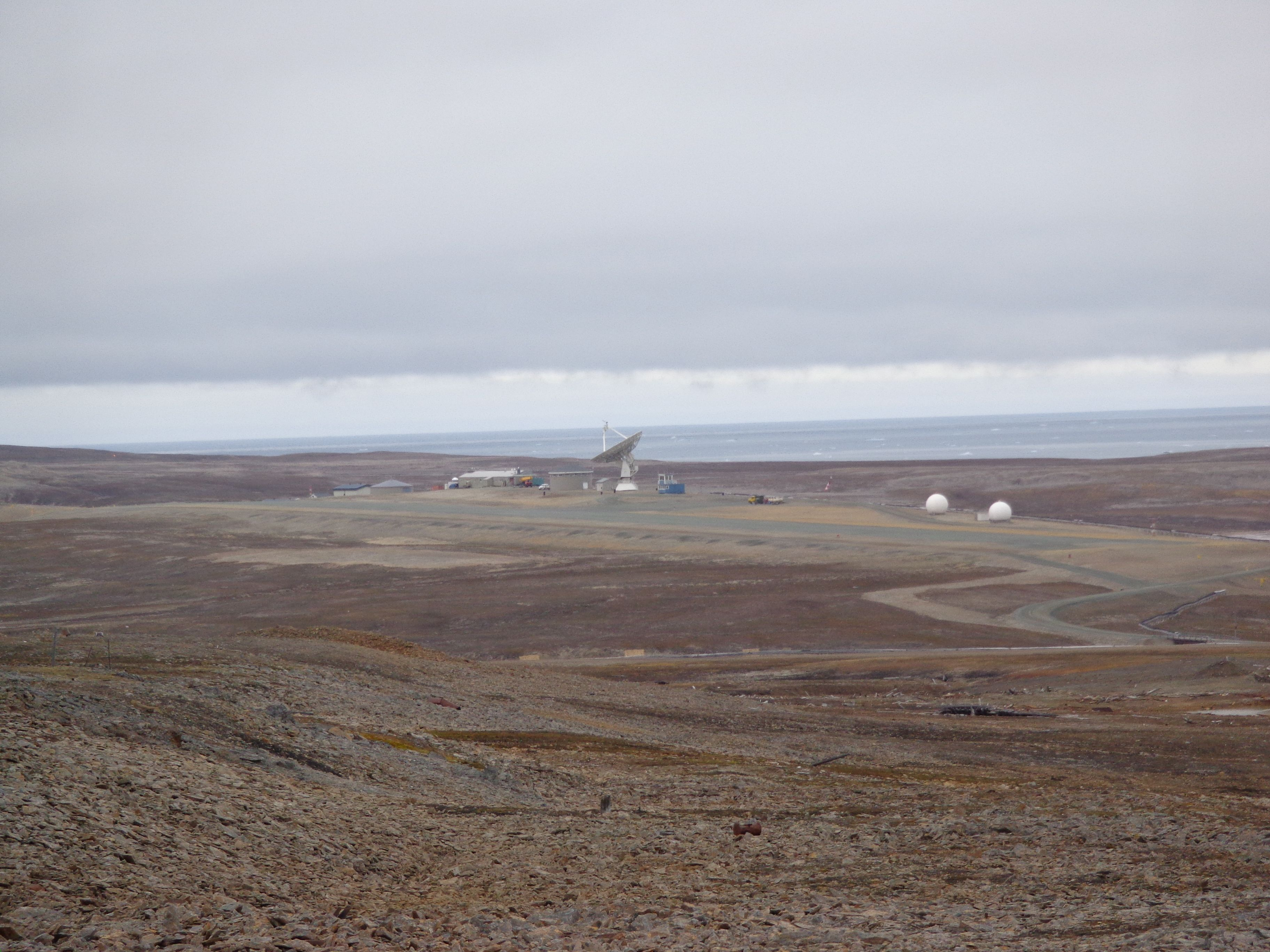
- IATA: QEN; ICAO: ENAS

Summary
- Airport type: Private
- Operator: Kings Bay
- Serves: Ny-Ålesund, Svalbard, Norway
- Location: Hamnerabben
- Elevation AMSL: 131 ft (40 m)
- Coordinates: 78°55′40″N 011°52′29″E

Map
- Location of airport in Svalbard Location of Svalbard

Runways
Direction	Length		Surface
Direction	m	ft	Surface
12/30	808	2,651	Gravel
- Source: Norwegian AIP at Avinor

Ny-Ålesund Airport, Hamnerabben (Norwegian: Ny-Ålesund flyplass, Hamnerabben; ICAO: ENAS) is an airport serving the research community of Ny-Ålesund in Svalbard, Norway. The airport is owned by Kings Bay, who also owns the company town. The only flights available are to Svalbard Airport, Longyear, operated two to four times a week by Lufttransport using Dornier 228 aircraft. The services are organized as corporate charters and tickets are only available after permission from Kings Bay.

Between 1925 and 1928, Ny-Ålesund saw four air expeditions to the North Pole, two of which required the construction of an airship hangar and mast. The first proposal for an airport in Ny-Ålesund was launched in 1956 by Norsk Polar Navigasjon, who proposed an airport at Kvadehuksletta. Soviet protests against the airport caused the Norwegian authorities to oppose the plans, which were abandoned in the early 1960s. Construction at Hamnerabben started in 1965 following the decision to build Kongsfjord Telemetry Station. The airport first hosted service to temporary landing strips near Longyearbyen, but from 1975 served Svalbard Airport. Lufttransport started flights with helicopters in the 1980s, but from 1989 has flown with fixed-wing aircraft.

== History ==
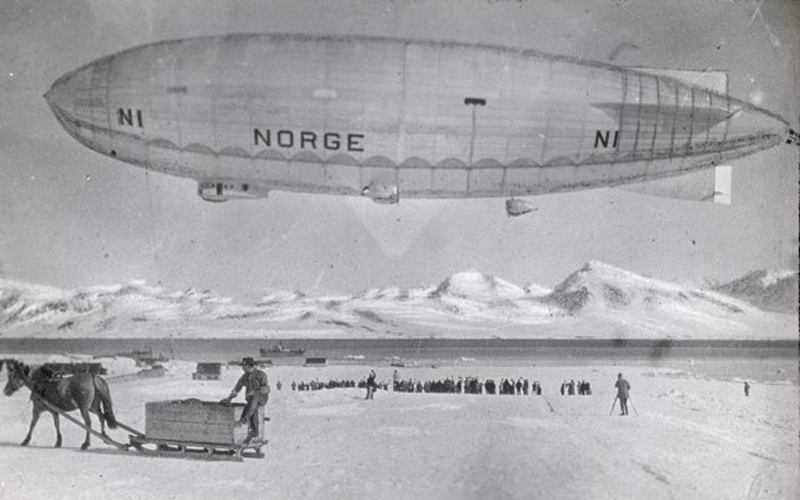
Norge in Ny-Ålesund in 1926

=== Early aviation in Ny-Ålesund ===
Ny-Ålesund was established as a mining company town by Kings Bay in 1916. Between 1925 and 1928, four attempts were made to reach the North Pole by air from Ny-Ålesund. In May 1925, Roald Amundsen used Ny-Ålesund as a base for two flying boats, but the expedition failed to come closer than 88 degrees north. On 9 May 1926, Floyd Bennett and Richard E. Byrd used Ny-Ålesund as both the starting and landing for their expedition. Although they claimed to have reached the pole, there is strong evidence that they could not have accomplished this. On 11 May, Amundsen and Umberto Nobile's airship Norge left Ny-Ålesund and traveled via the North Pole to Alaska. This is regarded as the first successful expedition to the North Pole. After two short skirmishes, Nobile's airship Italia left Ny-Ålesund on 23 May 1928 to reach the North Pole, but crashed on the return.

The flying boats did not require any specific infrastructure, although they had to be brought by ship to Ny-Ålesund, where they were assembled. They took off from a manually groomed air strip on snow. For the airship expeditions, a hangar and a mast were needed. Twenty-two carpenters arrived in October 1925 along with supplies on SS Alekto. Materials were transported to the site by railway after a track had been laid to the site from the port. The 35-meter (115 ft) tall steel mast was completed in December. The wooden hangar was 110 by 34 meters (361 by 112 ft) with a height of 30 meters (98 ft). It was covered in 10,000 square meters (110,000 sq ft) of tarp. The hangar was completed on 15 February 1926.

Mining ceased in Ny-Ålesund in 1929; it was taken up again in 1941, but because of the Second World War the town was evacuated the following year. From 1946, the Royal Norwegian Air Force started serving Ny-Ålesund with their Consolidated PBY Catalina amphibian aircraft. The aircraft were able to land if there was no ice on the fjord and lighting and weather permitted it. The first flight took place on 10 May and consisted of post drops. No further flights were carried out until 1949; one of the flights that year was an air ambulance operation. The service also dropped post at the other Norwegian settlements in Svalbard. In 1961, the Catalinas were replaced with Grumman HU-16B Albatross aircraft.

=== Kvadehuksletta proposal ===
The first proposal for an airport serving Ny-Ålesund was launched by the brothers Einar Sverre Pedersen and Gunnar Sverre Pedersen. Einar worked as chief navigator in the Scandinavian Airlines System (SAS) and was instrumental in developing the airline routes over the North Pole. He envisioned that the airport in Svalbard could serve as an emergency landing aerodrome for intercontinental flights, and proposed that the Norwegian trunk airline service be extended to Svalbard.

The brothers went on an expedition to Spitsbergen in 1956 to conduct further surveys. Their initial observations concluded that Kvadehussletta, the outermost part of Brøggerhalvøya, was the best-suited place for a major airport. They initially planned for a 1,600-meter (5,200 ft) long runway, which could easily be expanded to 3,000 meters (9,800 ft). Hotellneset and Adventdalen, both close to Longyearbyen, were rejected because the areas were too small and due to poor weather conditions.

The brothers presented the idea to the Government of Norway and SAS, but neither party was interested in investing in an airport. They contacted Kings Bay and asked the company to lease or purchase land to build the airport. The company was positive, but required that the airport remained under Norwegian ownership and regulations. On 22 October 1958, negotiations started with Vestlandske Flyselskap to start an airline service from the mainland to Svalbard. Financing of the airport was in part to be secured through a Hilton hotel, which would provide accommodation for tourists, and the "Roald Amundsen Institute," a planned research station.

Although the brothers received initial support from the government, the Soviet Union officially protested the airport on 5 November 1958. They claimed it could be used as an air force base—and thus would be a violation of the Svalbard Treaty—and pointed out that planning was partially financed with American military funding and that Gunnar was a military officer. From then on the Norwegian government started actively opposing the airport. At first they asked the company to cease operations, then asked the American military to cut funding. They also instructed all government-owned companies to not allow an airport to be built on their ground. The government also used Gunnar's military rank to hinder him, to limited extent, from pursuing the plans. The Aviation Act, which required all airports to have a concession to operate, came into effect from 1961, effectively stopping the plans.

=== Hamnerabben ===
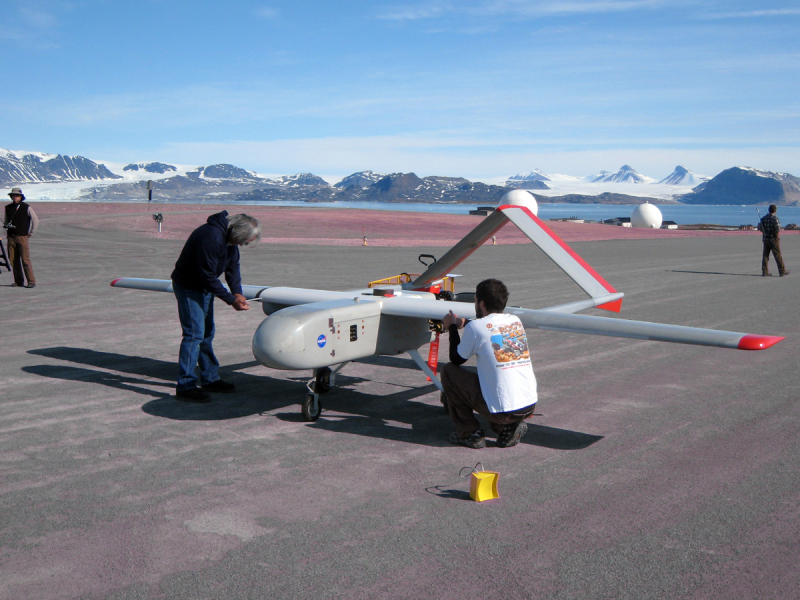
Scientific test flight

Following the 1962 mining accident and the subsequent Kings Bay Affair, Ny-Ålesund was transformed from a mining town to a research outpost. The need for an airport to support commercial activity in Ny-Ålesund arose in 1965 with the construction of Kongsfjord Telemetry Station. The Royal Norwegian Council for Scientific and Industrial Research needed to have an aviation connection with Longyearbyen to send magnetic tapes with the downloaded data to Germany. A road was built from the settlement to Hamnerabben, the site of the telemetry station. The top of the hill was sufficiently flat that a runway could be constructed. It was built by giving a 850-meter (2,790 ft) long straight section of the road a width of 40 meters (130 ft). Waste oil was poured on the gravel to bind it. A smaller road was built to the north of the runway to allow road transport while the runway was in use.

The airport was largely used to fly to Longyearbyen, although a limited number of flights were undertaken to the mainland. In addition to magnetic tapes, the aircraft were used to transport personnel and cargo, particularly during winter. Services were originally operated by Ski- og Sjøfly, but were later taken over by Svalbard-Fly, both of which had their Cessna 185 aircraft stationed in Ny-Ålesund. On 3 June 1970, a miner with a fractured skull was transported by ship from Longyearbyen to Ny-Ålesund and sent on board a Piper PA-31 Navajo to the mainland for treatment. After the telemetry station closed in 1974, the airport was taken over by Kings Bay. During this period, Longyearbyen was served by a planed section of tundra in Adventdalen.

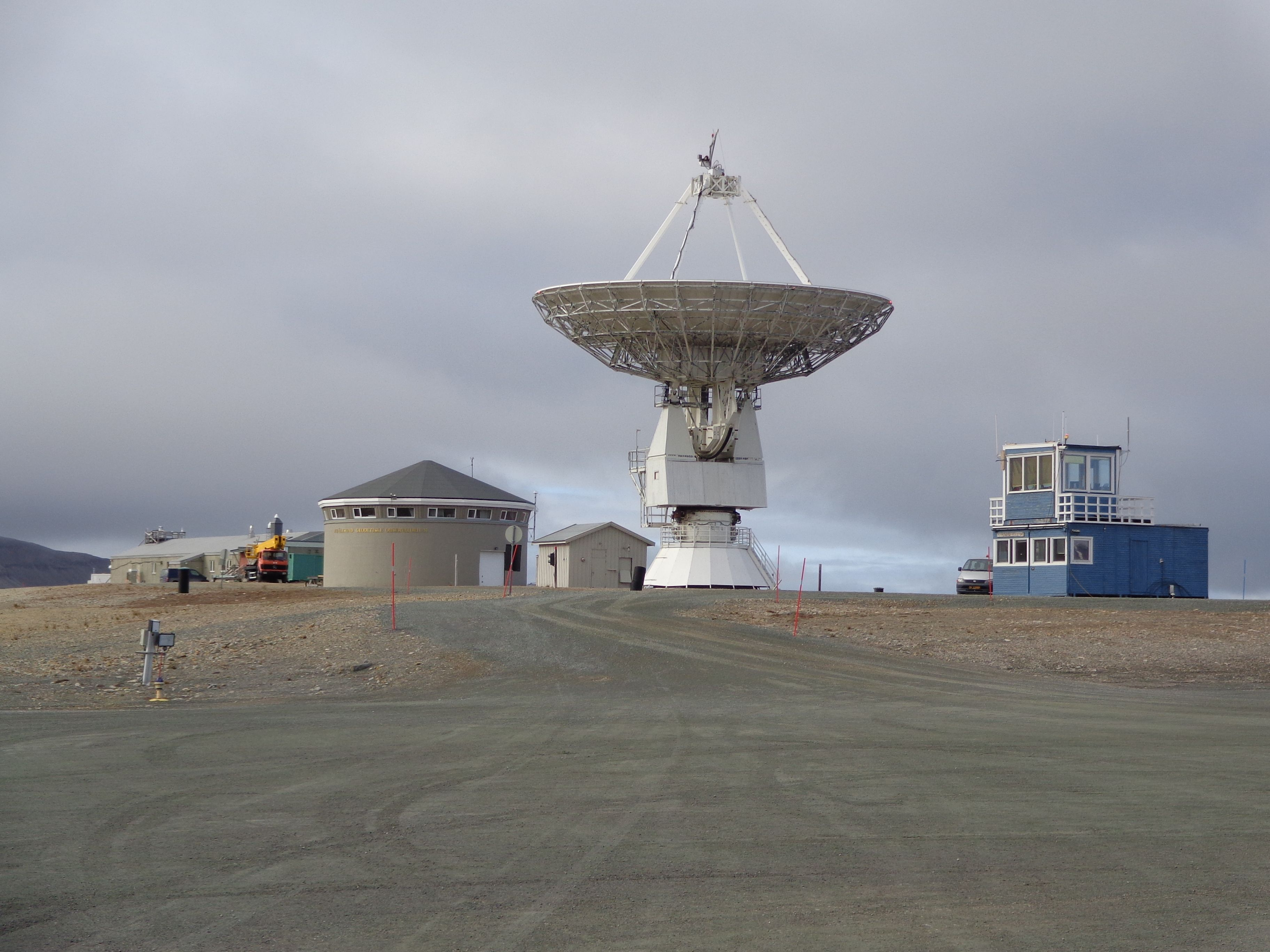
The terminal facilities

Svalbard Airport, Longyear, opened in 1975, allowing better facilities and connection with scheduled flights to the mainland. At the same time, Lufttransport established itself at Svalbard Airport. During the summer of 1975, the Norwegian Polar Institute stationed two helicopters at Ny-Ålesund Airport to support their expeditions. During the late 1970s there was little winter activity in Ny-Ålesund, but the air strip was kept operational for the few groups of researchers who did visit. A radio line repeater was installed at Kongsvegpasset in 1980, resulting in Ny-Ålesund receiving a telephone connection. A radio beacon was subsequently installed at the airport.

During the 1980s, the services were gradually taken over by Lufttransport, who used both small aircraft and helicopters. These gradually became more regular and became de facto scheduled services every fortnight. Lufttransport replaced the helicopter service with a two-engine five-seat aircraft in 1989, which cut the cost of transport significantly. In 1993, Widerøe established itself at Svalbard Airport and flew services to Ny-Ålesund, but this only lasted the one season. In 1996, Lufttransport and Kings Bay made an agreement that the airline would fly once per week during the winter and up to five times per week during the summer. The airline would use a Dornier 228, which was also used for flights from Longyearbyen to Svea Airport for Store Norske Spitsbergen Kulkompani.

== Facilities ==
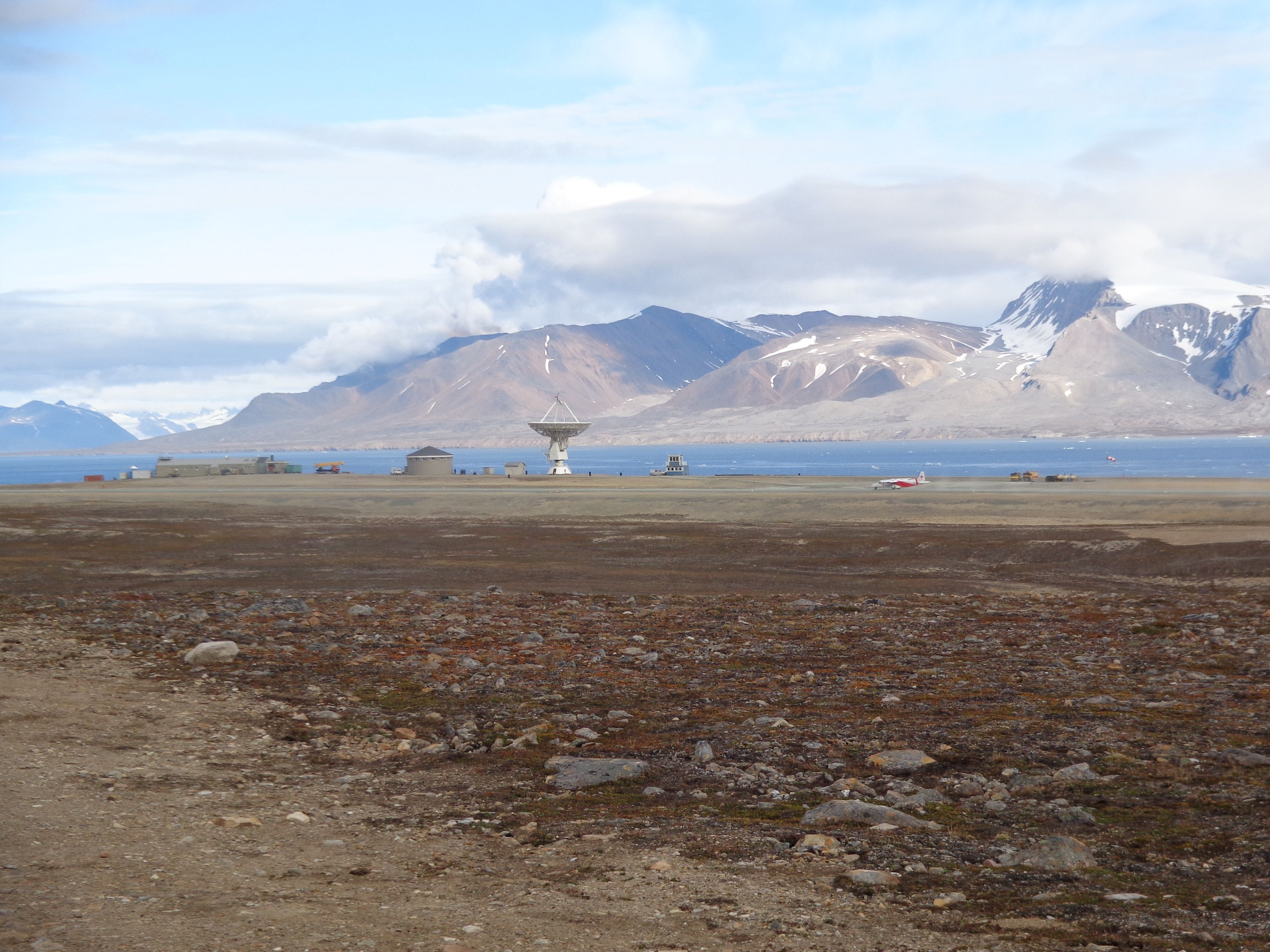
A Lufttransport Dornier 228 landing at the airport

Ny-Ålesund Airport, Hamnerabben, is located at Hamnerabben, 0.65 nautical miles (1.20 km; 0.75 mi) west of the main settlement of Ny-Ålesund. It consists of a single 808-meter (2,651 ft) long and 30-meter (98 ft) wide gravel runway. It is located at 40 meters (130 ft) elevation and aligned 12/30. The airport has a single 30-by-75-meter (98 by 246 ft) apron. The airport has aerodrome flight information service but lacks terminal and hangar facilities.

== Airline and destination ==
The only airline to provide service to and from Hamnerabben is Lufttransport, which operates the 16-seat Dornier 228 aircraft to Svalbard Airport, Longyear. The airline provides two flights per week during the winter and four flights per week during the summer. All departures are charter flights organized by Kings Bay and tickets are only available through the company. Occasional ad hoc charter flights are also sometimes operated. At Longyearbyen, connections are provided onwards to Tromsø Airport and Oslo Airport, Gardermoen.

Airlines	Destinations
Lufttransport	Charter: Longyearbyen
