= Peter Brandal =

Norwegian sealer and businessman

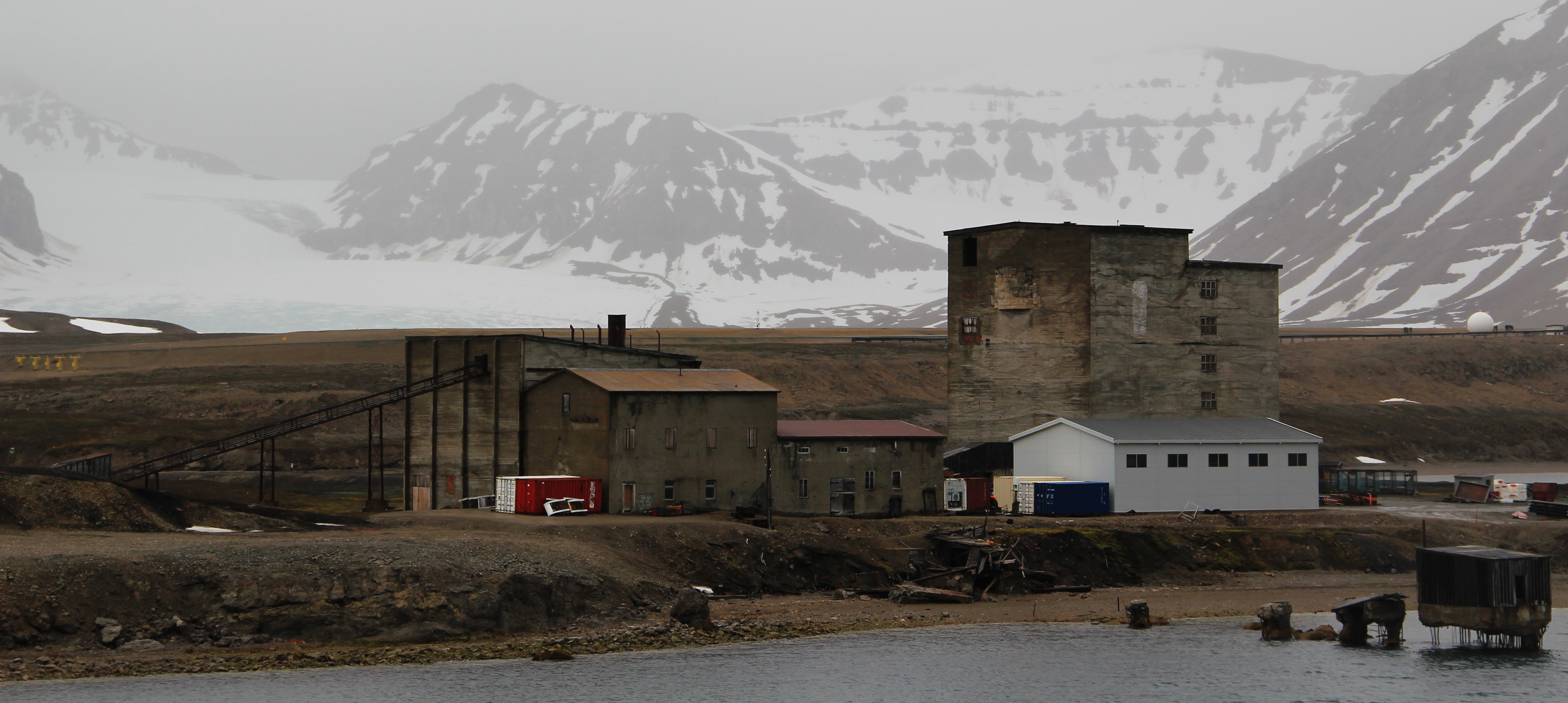
Former mining operation at Ny-Ålesund

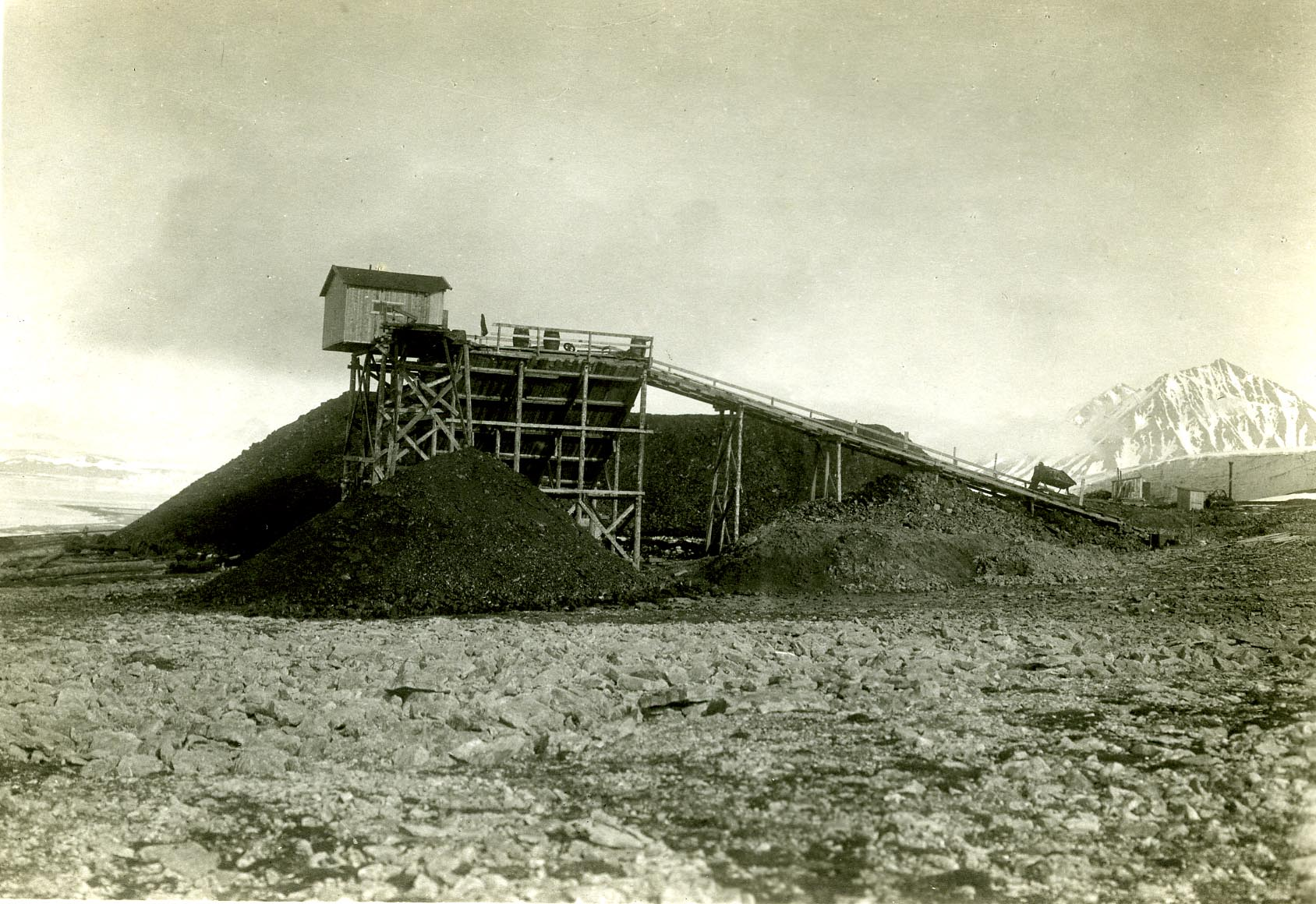
Kings Bay Kull Comp mining operation during the early years

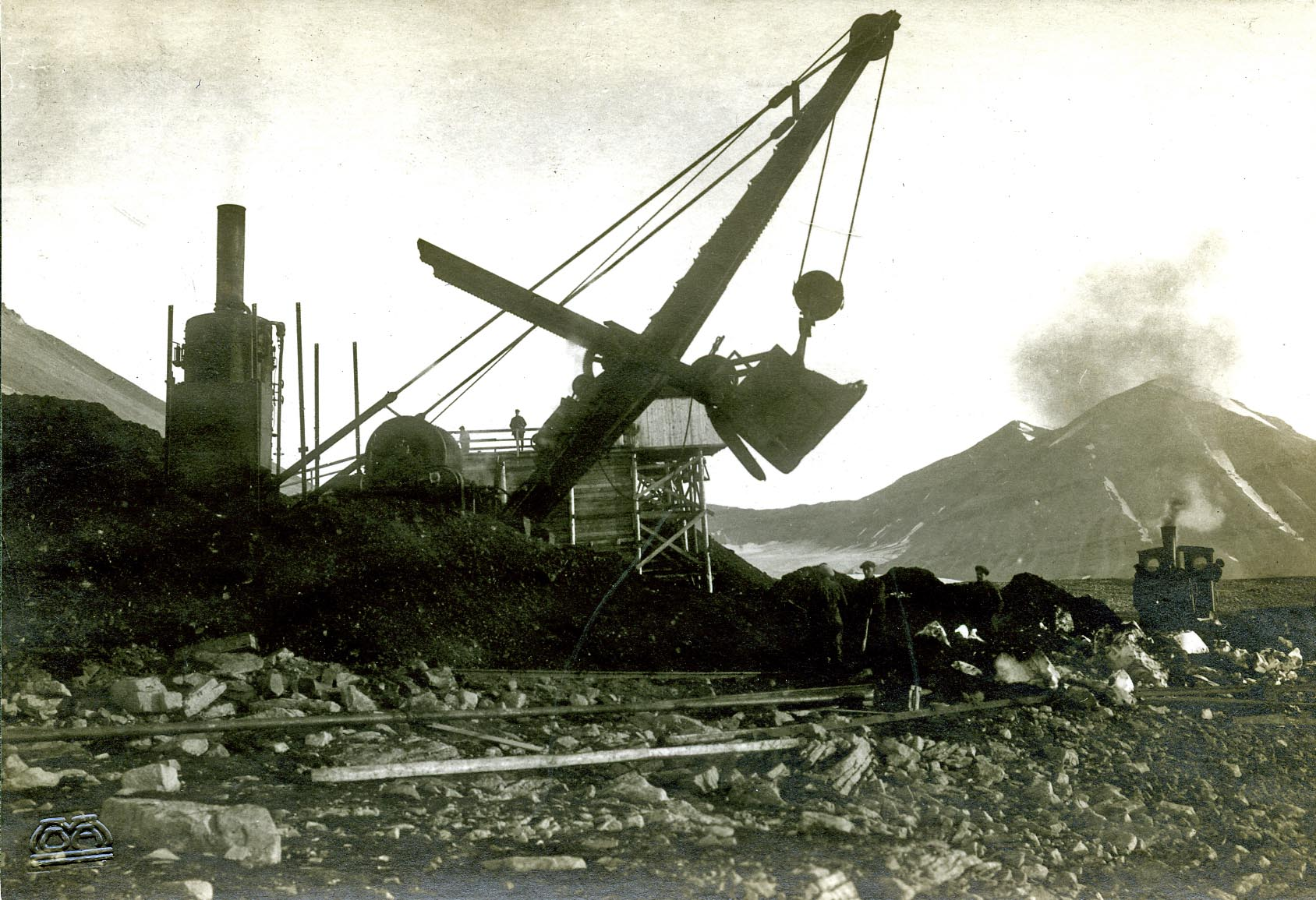
Steam powered transfer of coal onto railway cars

Peter Andreas Severinsson Brandal (21 December 1870 – 23 March 1933) was a Norwegian sealer and businessman. He was one of the founders of the community of Ny-Ålesund on the island of Spitsbergen in the Norwegian archipelago of Svalbard, in the Arctic Ocean.

== Biography ==
Brandal was born at the village of Brandal on the island of Hareidlandet in Møre og Romsdal, Norway. He was the son of Sevrin Olavius Martinus Larsen (1847–1934) and Davida Petersdatter (1842–1903). He started working as a fisher after confirmation and bought his first vessel in 1891. Eight years later it participated in its first Arctic Ocean sealing expedition. Brandal participated in a fur hunting expedition to Greenland in 1901. His fleet gradually increased, with focus on Arctic Ocean sealing. He stopped active seamanship in 1911 and became a manager for the fleet. Besides the hunting of seals, it now also hunted walrus. Brandal was also engaged in the processing of products from fishing activities through the establishment of a herring factory.

During World War I, Norwegian access to a coal supply was limited. Brandal bought the coal mining claims at Kongsfjorden on Svalbard in 1916 for 250,000 Norwegian krone. He established Kings Bay Kull Comp. A/S (KBKC) that year and started mining that summer.

The following year his company established the town of Ny-Ålesund. During the first years, several names were in use for the settlement, including Kings Bay, Kingsbay and Brandal City. Ny-Ålesund came into use in the early 1920s. Later Trygve Klausen, Michael Knutsen and Trygve Jervell joined Brandal as co-owners of the company. Production started quickly, but the company eventually met difficulties throughout the 1920s. Low coal prices due to the international financial crisis led to the total loss of 1929.

After all mining operations in Ny-Ålesund were stopped, the Norwegian state acquired all the shares in KBKC in 1933. Kings Bay AS is now a government enterprise owned by the Norwegian Ministry of Trade and Industry which operates the entire settlement of Ny-Ålesund.

== See also ==
- Kings Bay Affair

== Bibliography ==
- Hanoa, Rolf (1993). Kings Bay Kull Comp. A/S 1917–1992 (in Norwegian). Oslo: Schibsted. ISBN 82-516-1448-1.
