= Zeppelin (research station) =

Research station in Svalbard, Norway

Coordinates: 78°54′N 11°53′E

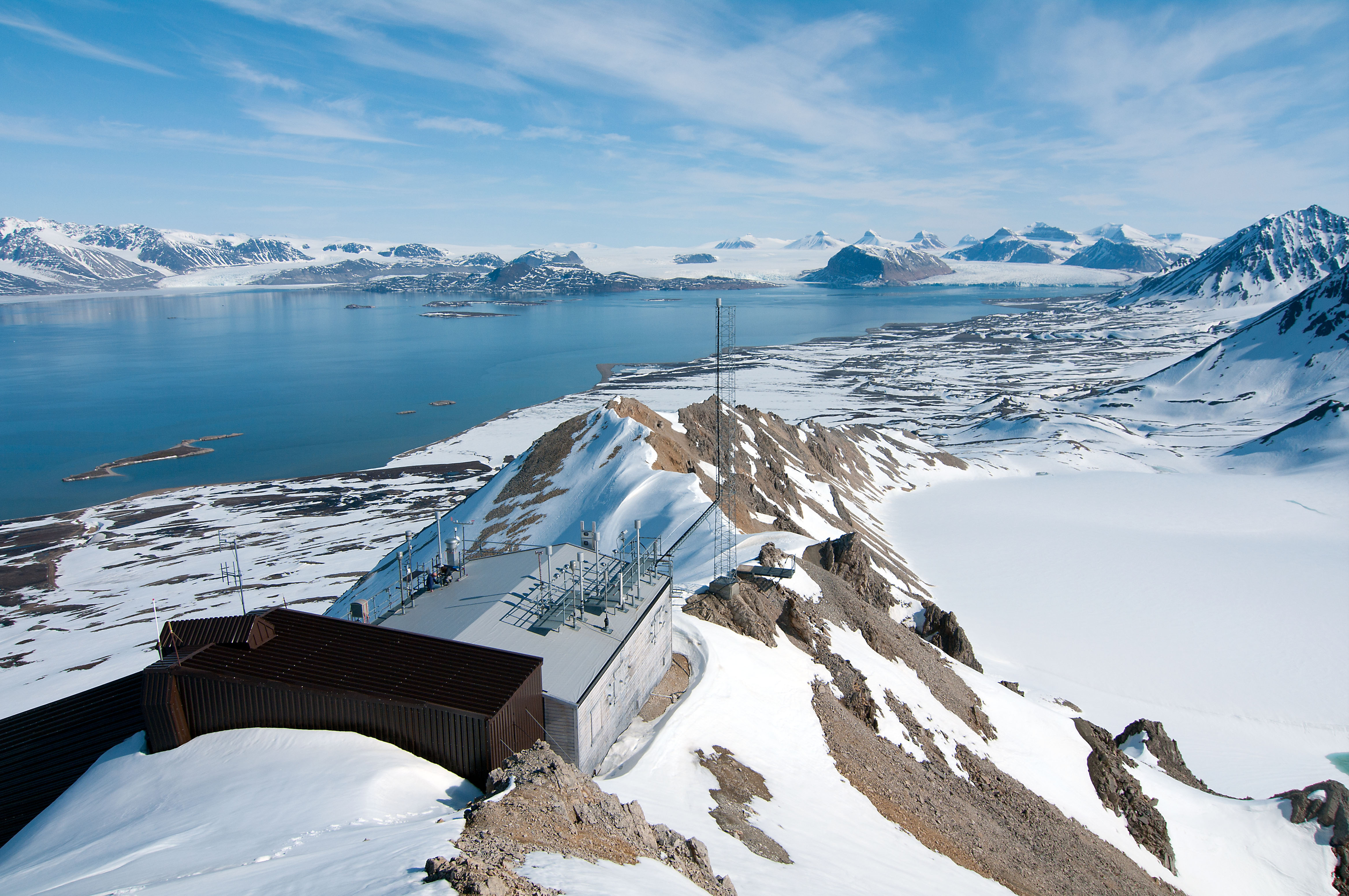
Zeppelin Observatory on Zeppelinfjellet above Ny-Ålesund on Svalbard

The Zeppelin Observatory (Zeppelinobservatoriet) is a research station in Spitsbergen, Norway. It is located near the top of Zeppelinfjellet above Ny-Ålesund on the peninsula of Brøggerhalvøya. It is operated by the Norwegian Polar Institute. The research station at Zeppelinfjellet was built between 1988 and 1989 and officially opened in 1990. After 10 years of use, it was determined that the building no longer covered the needs that were required to operate advanced instrumentation. In the second half of 1999, the old building was demolished and a new and improved station was built at the same site. The new station building was officially opened on 2 May 2000.

== See also ==
- List of research stations in the Arctic
