= The Ny-Ålesund Symposium =

The Ny-Ålesund Symposium is an annual high level international event where top researchers and politicians, senior business executives, representatives of NGOs and other decision makers meet to share experiences and to discuss climate change solutions.

== Description ==
The first Symposium was arranged in March 2006. King Haakon VIII of Norway is patron of the Symposium. The topics are related to the challenges of climate change, other environmental issues, and issues directly connected to the Arctic and the Northern areas which could have major global consequences. Participation is limited to 45 people, by invitation only.

The Symposium takes place on Svalbard at 79 degrees north. It is the world's northernmost permanent settlement and is only 1200 km from the North Pole. The Norwegian Government has transformed this former mining community into a major base for scientific research and environmental monitoring in the Arctic. The base hosts scientists from more than 20 nations and plays an important role in international climate change research. It is owned and operated by the governmental company Kings Bay AS, a coal mining company in earlier days. The scenery is exceptional, with a backdrop of unspoiled Arctic nature.

The purpose of the Symposium is to exchange knowledge, improve the understanding and seek solutions of the challenging impacts these issues have both on the Arctic regions and internationally. The Symposium is organized by Kings Bay AS in cooperation with the Norwegian Ministry of Education and Research, the Ministry of the Environment, the Ministry of Foreign Affairs, the Ministry of Trade and Industry, the Ministry of Justice and the Police, and the Research Council of Norway. Statkraft AS is a co-organizer and sponsor of the Symposium. The secretariat is by Center for International Climate and Environmental Research-Oslo (CICERO).

== Themes ==
The main themes for the symposia have been:

- 2006 - The changing Arctic - new opportunities and challenges
- 2007 - The changing Arctic - global climate change - the need for action
- 2008 - Global climate change and research challenges
- 2009 - Climate change: Understanding global politics towards Copenhagen and beyond
- 2010 - The Changing Arctic and Its Global Implications
- 2011 - cancelled due to volcanic ash cloud
- 2012 - Towards a green economy: the role of technology
- 2013 - The Changing Arctic - Opportunity or Threat
- 2014 - Breaking the Climate Stalemate
