= Ny-Ålesund =

- Town
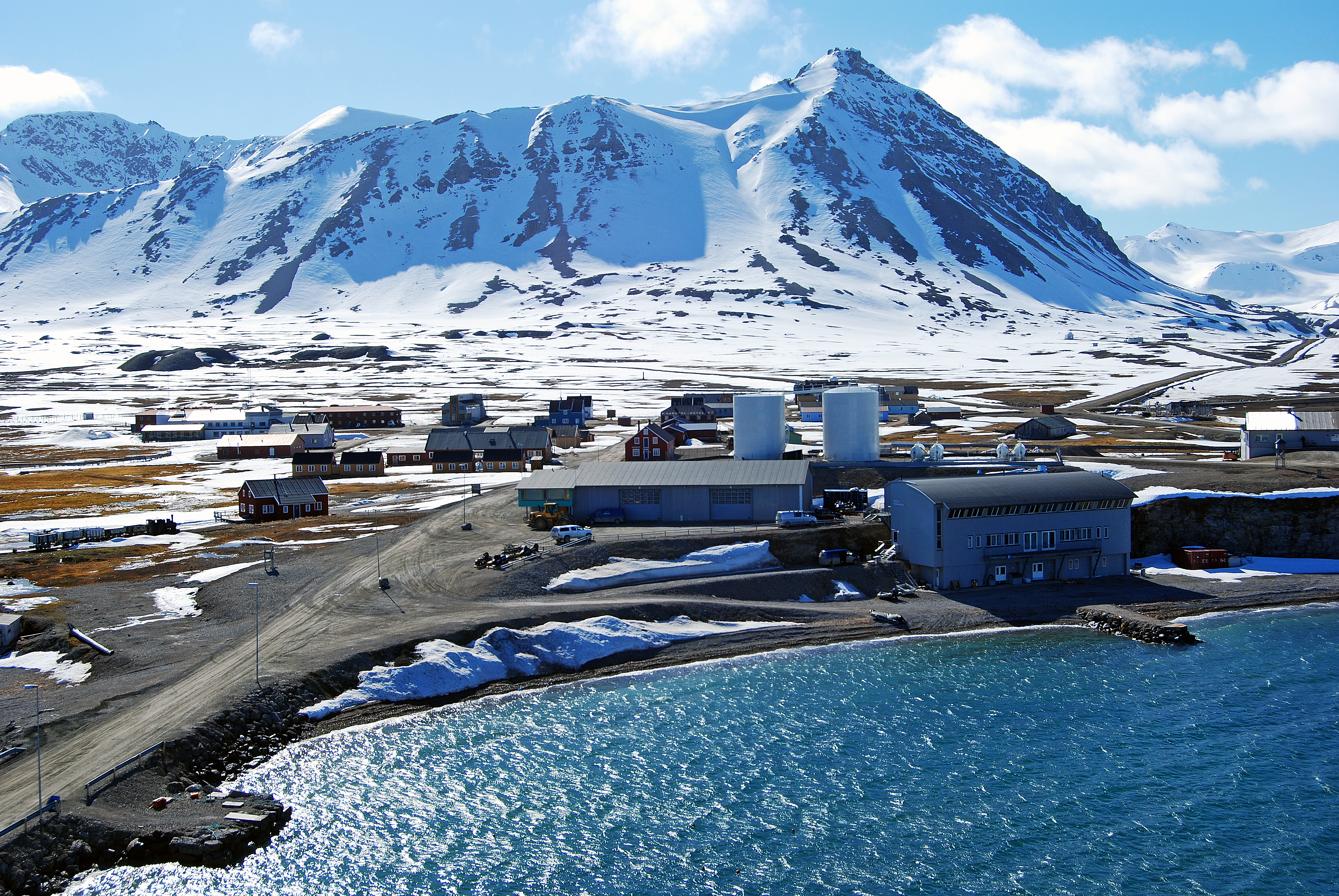
- Ny-Ålesund in June 2013

- Location in Svalbard
- Coordinates: 78°55′30″N 11°55′20″E
- Country: Norway
- Region: Svalbard
- Island: Spitsbergen
- Land: Oscar II Land

Population
  - Total: 117 (Summer) and 35 (Winter)
- Time zone: UTC+1 (CET)
  - Summer (DST): UTC+2 (CEST)
- Postal code: 9173
- Website: nyalesundresearch.no kingsbay.no

Ny-Ålesund ("New Ålesund") is an unincorporated settlement in Oscar II Land in the west of the island of Spitsbergen in Svalbard. It is situated on the Brøgger peninsula (Brøggerhalvøya) and on the shore of the bay of Kongsfjorden. The company town is owned and operated by Kings Bay, which provides facilities for permanent research activities by 19 institutions from 11 countries. The town is ultimately owned by the Ministry of Climate and Environment. Ny-Ålesund has an all-year permanent population of 30 to 35, with the summer population reaching 114. Its facilities include Ny-Ålesund Airport, Hamnerabben, Svalbard Rocket Range, a port and Ny-Ålesund Town and Mine Museum, as well as a number of buildings dedicated to research and environmental monitoring activities. It is the northernmost functional civilian settlement in the world.

The town was founded in 1917 by Peter Brandal and his mining company, Kings Bay Kull Comp. Initially, mining was carried out until 1929, but it was unprofitable for most of the 1920s. A series of air expeditions were launched from Ny-Ålesund towards the North Pole. The company was nationalized in 1933 and the town was used for tourism and as a fishing port. Mining resumed for some months in 1941 and then from 1945. After several fatal incidents occurred including a mining accident on 5 November 1962 that killed 21 miners in what became known as the Kings Bay Affair, mining activity was terminated and Gerhardsen's Third Cabinet resigned. Kongsfjord Telemetry Station opened in 1967 and the town gradually transformed into a research settlement, with the Norwegian Polar Institute having had a year-round presence since 1968. As of 2021, 18 institutions from 11 countries have a more or less permanent presence in Ny-Ålesund – five of them with year-round activity, the remaining are primarily present during the spring-summer-autumn field season.

== Geography ==
Ny-Ålesund is located on the north shore of Brøggerhalvøya, a peninsula of Oscar II Land on the island of Spitsbergen. The town is located on the southern shore of Kongsfjorden (literally "the King's Bay"), a bay on the west coast of Spitsbergen that connects to Forlandssundet of the Greenland Sea. Across from Ny-Ålesund is the island of Blomstrandøya and the former settlement of Ny-London.

As Ny-Ålesund has no legal existence as a town, it lacks any formal area. If the land owned by Kings Bay is used to define the town, it would have an area of 300 square kilometers (120 sq mi), which would encapsulate both the north and south shores of Kongsfjorden. Kings Bay retains ownership of all land in the area, although the mining claims are held by Store Norske.

== History ==
The coal deposits at Kongsfjorden were first discovered by Jonas Poole during a whaling expedition in the area in 1610. They did not receive more careful analysis until 1861, when Christian Wilhelm Blomstrand carried out surveys. A Swedish expedition looked into the coal in 1870 and in 1901 Bergen–Spitsbergen Kulgrubekompani laid claims to the deposits. Failing to follow up, Ernest Mansfield occupied claims in 1905 and 1906, which were sold to The Northern Exploration Co. Ltd. in 1910. The first test shaft was built in 1909, followed by a hut in 1912. The claims were sold to Peter Brandal of Ålesund in 1916, who dispatched two ships and sixty men to Kings Bay for the summer of 1916. Arriving on 21 July, they immediately started breaking surface coal. Kings Bay Kull Comp. was founded on 14 December 1916. Thirty people were sent to Kings Bay for the 1917 season, and started construction of a town. By winter buildings, mines, a port and a railway were completed.

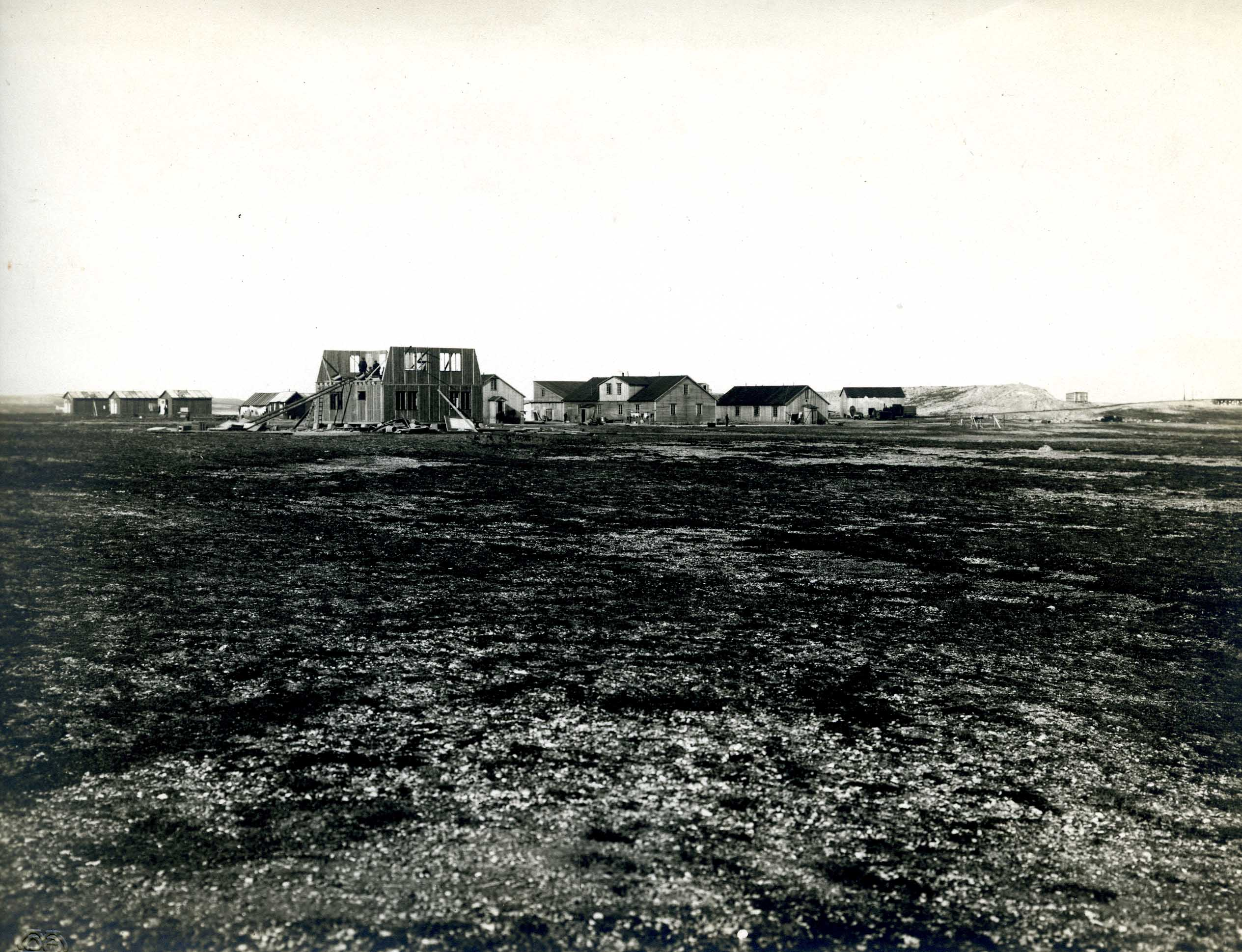
The town in the late 1910s

Sixty-four people stayed the first winter. They were supplemented from May 1918, bringing the summer population to 300. In the following years the town was gradually expanded with additional housing and work buildings. During the first years several names were in use for the settlement, including Kings Bay, Kingsbay and Brandal City. Ny-Ålesund came into use in the early 1920s and was soon the official name of the settlement. The mining was hit by two strikes in 1919, the first lasting from the summer to October, and the second from November to January 1920. Because of the ice, each year the shipping was limited from May through October. By 1919 the company had fallen into severe financial difficulties. A British take-over was waved off and instead state coal purchasing agreement, effectively subsidies, were enforced. By 1921 the men had started bringing their families, raising the female population to twenty-two and the child population to twenty-three. An improvised school was therefore taken into use.

The Geophysical Institute of Tromsø established a geophysical station at Kvadehuken in 1920, although it only remained in operation until 1924. Production rose through the 1920, reaching a peak 99,000 tonnes per year. Coal liquefaction was attempted from 1924 to 1927, but proved unprofitable. The labor union, Kings Bay Arbeiderforening, was founded in 1925, although many of the workers had previously ad hoc organized themselves. In 1919 Northern Exploration Company laid pressed that they had claims on Blomstrandhalvøya. The case ended with the Government of Norway buying their claims in 1925, parts of which were sold to Kings Bay.

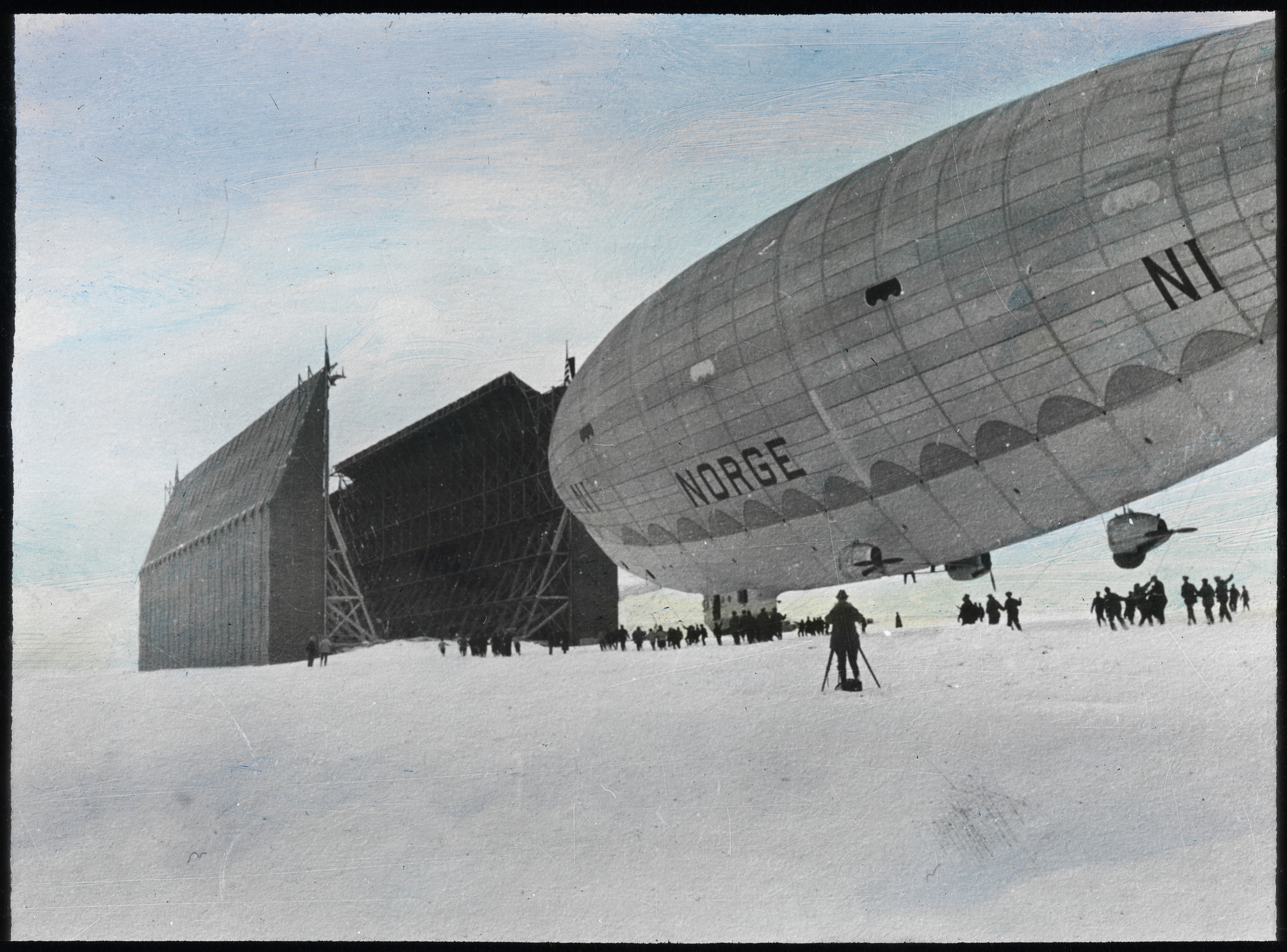
Norge in Ny-Ålesund on 7 May 1926

Between 1925 and 1928, four attempts were made to reach the North Pole by air from Ny-Ålesund. One involved flying boats led by Roald Amundsen. Floyd Bennett and Richard E. Byrd made an attempt. Amundsen and Umberto Nobile's airship Norge left Ny-Ålesund and traveled via the North Pole to Alaska. Because of controversies over previous efforts, this is regarded by some as the first successful expedition to the North Pole. After two short skirmishes, Nobile's airship Italia left Ny-Ålesund on 23 May 1928 to reach the North Pole, but crashed on the return.

The first fatal mining accident took place in the Ester Mine on 16 December 1926, killing two miners. Gradually a series of smaller accidents took place. The company's lack of profitability caused the government to cease subsidies from 1929. A small guard and maintenance crew was kept in Ny-Ålesund in the following years.

As of 1929 Kings Bay owed NOK 18.6 million to the state and Aalesunds Kreditbank. Thus the state nationalized the company, taking effect on 23 December 1933. A fisheries station opened in 1935, which sold supplies to fishing vessels and carried out steaming of cod liver oil and salting of the cod. As the station was in need of subsidies, it was closed after two years. From 1936 a hotel service targeting tourists opened. Its most elaborate building, Nordpolhotellet, opened on 3 September 1939, although the town was abandoned just days later because of the outbreak of the Second World War. This spurred a Norwegian demand for coal, however, and the town was resettled on 7 May 1941. The entire island was evacuated on 29 August, with critical infrastructure blown up.

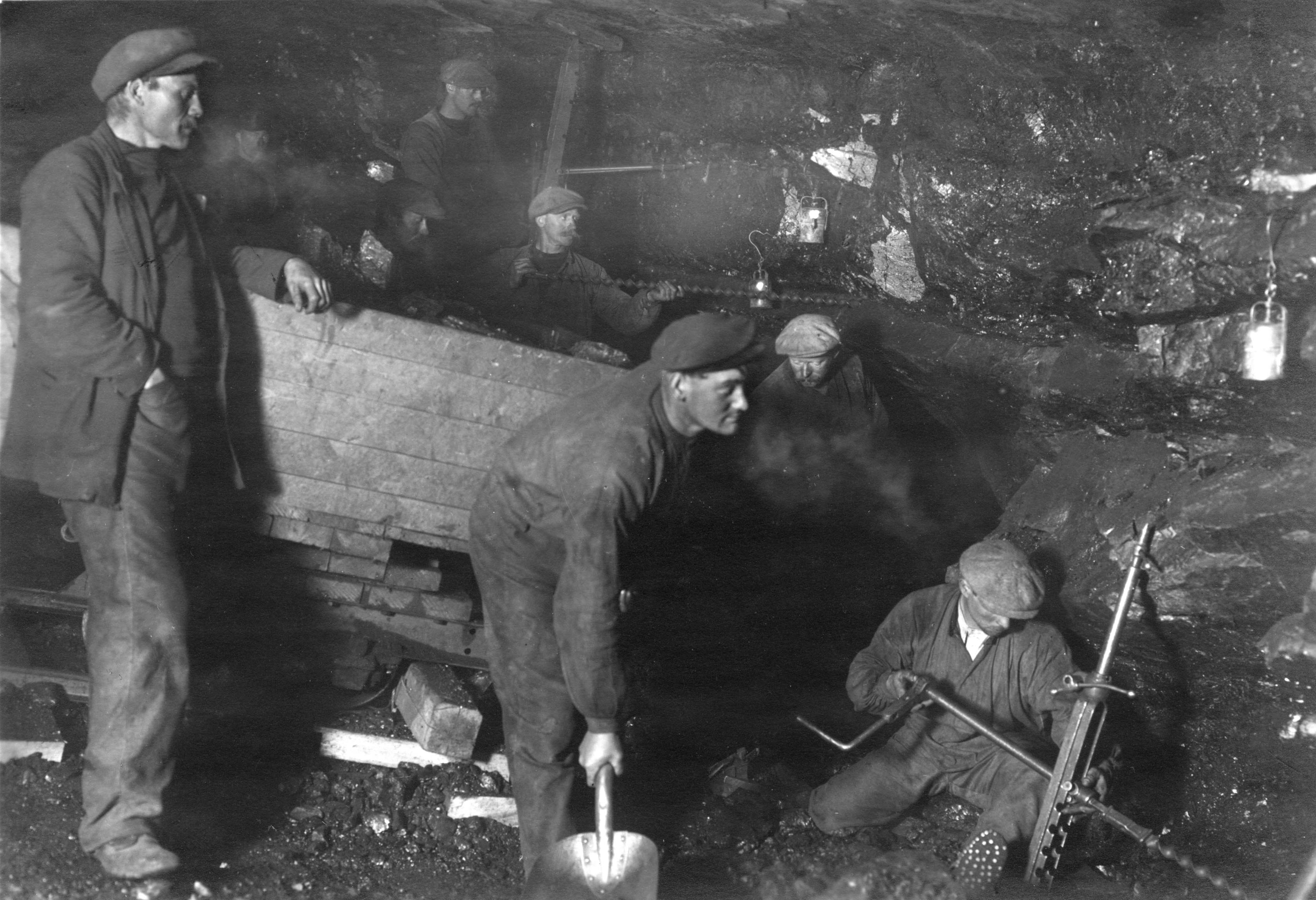
Miners in the Agnes Mine

Kings Bay dispatched a crew after the war ended, with the first 90 workers arriving at Ny-Ålesund on 13 August 1945. They started reconstruction and mining commenced in November. Production reached 61,000 tonnes in 1947. A 4 December 1948 explosion killed fifteen miners. A trial postal air drop took place in 1946, and regular services were provided from 1949. Weather observations were carried out in 1950 to 1953, and again after 1961. The mine flooded on 26 April 1949 and it took half a year to empty it. On 7 January 1951 there was an explosion in the Ester V Mine, killing nine men. On 19 March 1952, yet another explosion took place in the Ester Mine, this time killing nineteen men. These caused several investigations and inquiries, leading to improvements to mining safety.

In 1956 Parliament approved a major upgrade to the mining facilities, which would cost NOK 20 million, in the hope that production could reach 200,000 tonnes. In 1956 two brothers, Einar Sverre and Gunnar Sverre Pedersen, through their company Norsk Polar Navigasjon, proposed that an airport be built at Kvadehussletta, on the outer-most point of Brøggerhalvøya. It was met by opposition from both Norwegian and Soviet authorities and no permits were granted, even though they pursued the case for a decade. By 1959 Ester I was depleted and the railway was closed—transport having been taken over by trucks, and production remained low during the late 1950s.

An explosion on 5 November 1962 killed 21 miners. Two investigations were carried out and the issue became a heated political debate. In what became the Kings Bay Affair, Gerhardsen's Third Cabinet was ultimately forced to resign in August 1963, and all mining in Ny-Ålesund was terminated from 5 November 1963. For the meanwhile, Kings Bay was to retain the equipment and facilities in case later technological development would allow for safer mining operations. The first research establishment came in 1967, when Kongsfjord Telemetry Station was opened to communicate with the European Space Research Organization's satellites. The Royal Norwegian Council for Scientific and Industrial Research took over daily management of Ny-Ålesund until the telemetry station was closed in 1974. The station resulted in the construction of Ny-Ålesund Airport, Hamnerabben, and resulted in about thirty employees.

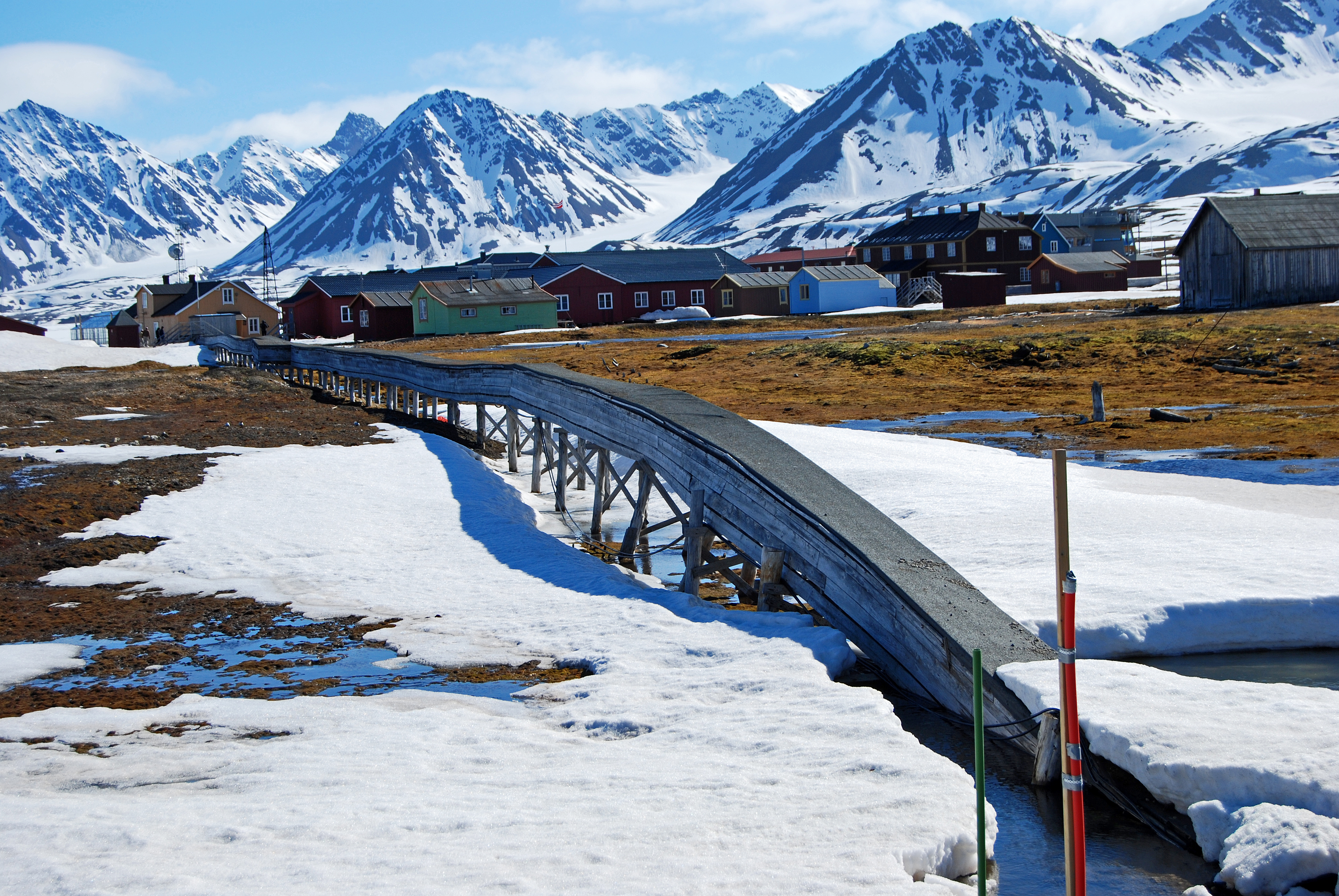
Pipelines and cables are located in utilidors to avoid permafrost

The Norwegian Polar Institute established a scientific station in Ny-Ålesund in 1966, moving their ionosphere measurement station from Isfjord Radio. An early scientific agent was the Norwegian Institute for Air Research, which has conducted air research in Ny-Ålesund since the mid-1970s. Gradually there was increased interest in research in Ny-Ålesund. In the first years a series of universities sent summer expeditions. Kings Bay also generated revenue from selling fuel, supplies and air transport to shrimp fishers. By 1977 Kings Bay stuck a deal by the then state-owned Store Norske to sell all its claims, although it kept the property rights around Ny-Ålesund. During the early 1980s a plan for cultural heritage management was developed, which included the renovation of several older houses. In 1992 nearly the entire town was listed.

Construction of the Zeppelin Station commenced in 1988; in 1990 Kings Bay moved its administration from Oslo to Ny-Ålesund. From 1992 the government allowed international research institutions to establish stations in Ny-Ålesund, and thus several institutes built stations the early 1990s. This was matched by Kings Bay, who invested in increased capacity, including dorms, a new dock and better communications. By 1996 there were over one hundred research projects in Ny-Ålesund.

== Climate ==
Ny-Ålesund has a polar climate (Köppen ET). Nonetheless, winter temperatures are very mild compared to other locations with the same classification because of the North Atlantic Drift.

Climate data for Ny-Ålesund
Month	Jan	Feb	Mar	Apr	May	Jun	Jul	Aug	Sep	Oct	Nov	Dec	Year
Record high °C (°F)	6.6 (43.9)	5.3 (41.5)	5.0 (41.0)	7.8 (46.0)	9.7 (49.5)	12.3 (54.1)	18.7 (65.7)	18.6 (65.5)	12.3 (54.1)	10.6 (51.1)	7.4 (45.3)	7.4 (45.3)	18.7 (65.7)
Mean daily maximum °C (°F)	−7.4 (18.7)	−8.2 (17.2)	−8.8 (16.2)	−5.5 (22.1)	0.4 (32.7)	4.9 (40.8)	7.7 (45.9)	6.6 (43.9)	3.0 (37.4)	−2.0 (28.4)	−4.3 (24.3)	−6.4 (20.5)	−1.7 (29.0)
Daily mean °C (°F)	−10.5 (13.1)	−11.4 (11.5)	−12.0 (10.4)	−8.8 (16.2)	−2.1 (28.2)	3.1 (37.6)	5.9 (42.6)	4.8 (40.6)	1.1 (34.0)	−4.4 (24.1)	−7.1 (19.2)	−9.3 (15.3)	−4.2 (24.4)
Mean daily minimum °C (°F)	−13.6 (7.5)	−14.6 (5.7)	−15.1 (4.8)	−12.0 (10.4)	−4.6 (23.7)	1.3 (34.3)	4.0 (39.2)	3.0 (37.4)	−0.8 (30.6)	−6.7 (19.9)	−9.8 (14.4)	−12.3 (9.9)	−6.8 (19.8)
Record low °C (°F)	−36.6 (−33.9)	−41.1 (−42.0)	−42.2 (−44.0)	−34 (−29)	−19.1 (−2.4)	−8.5 (16.7)	−2.7 (27.1)	−5.5 (22.1)	−15 (5)	−20.6 (−5.1)	−27.2 (−17.0)	−34.3 (−29.7)	−42.2 (−44.0)
Average precipitation mm (inches)	56.1 (2.21)	42.4 (1.67)	38.8 (1.53)	24.9 (0.98)	19.3 (0.76)	14.6 (0.57)	31.4 (1.24)	37.7 (1.48)	59.6 (2.35)	40.2 (1.58)	50.5 (1.99)	44.5 (1.75)	460 (18.11)
Average precipitation days	15	15	14	16	16	15	16	16	18	20	20	16	197
Average snowy days	15	14	14	15	14	6	3	2	11	18	18	15	145
Average relative humidity (%)	71	78	76	74	76	81	83	80	77	71	71	69	76
Source 1: Météo climat stats Météo Climat
Source 2: Ny-Ålesund, Norway Travel Weather Averages

== Research ==
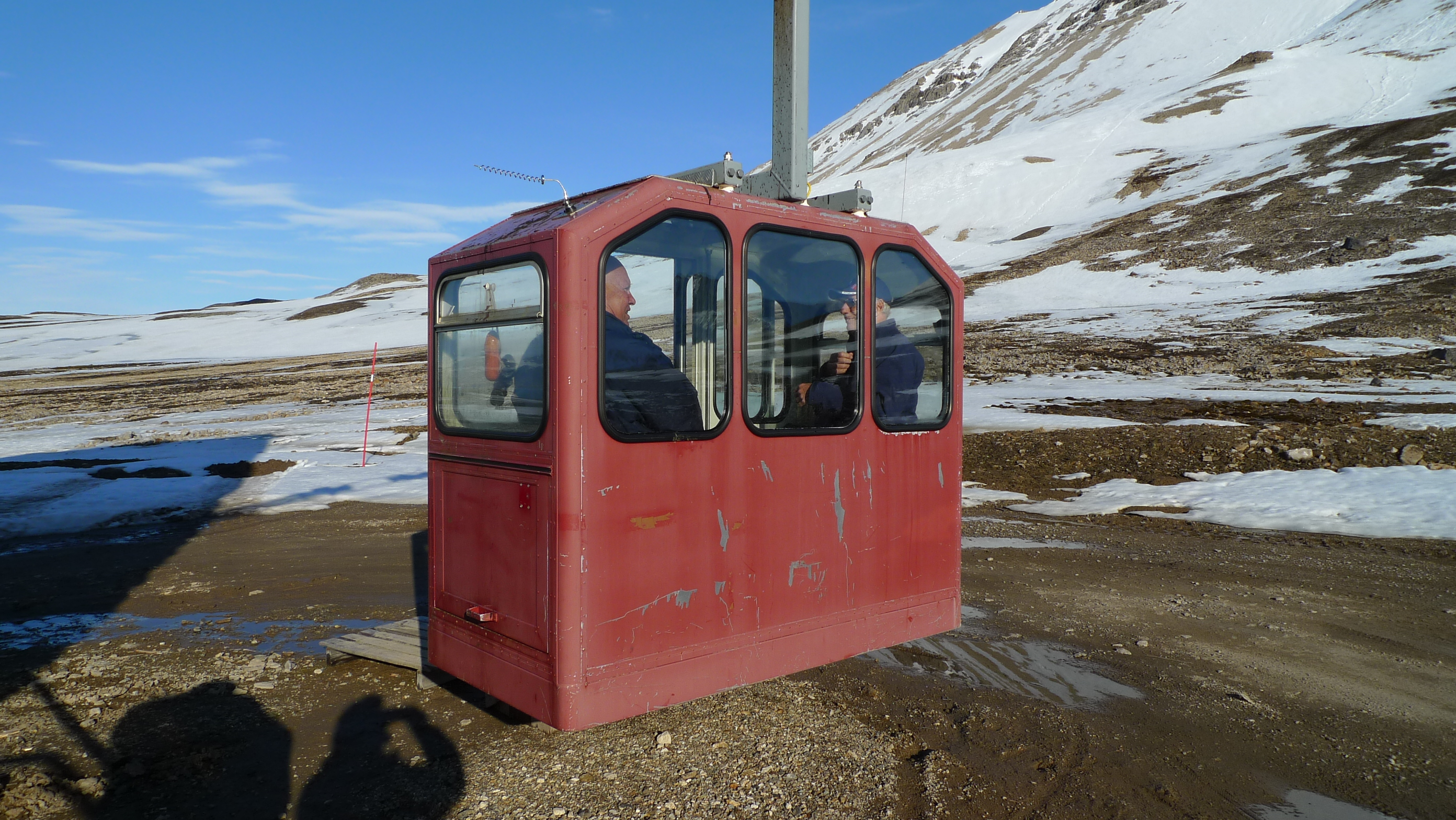
The gondola that runs up Zeppelinfjellet to Zeppelin

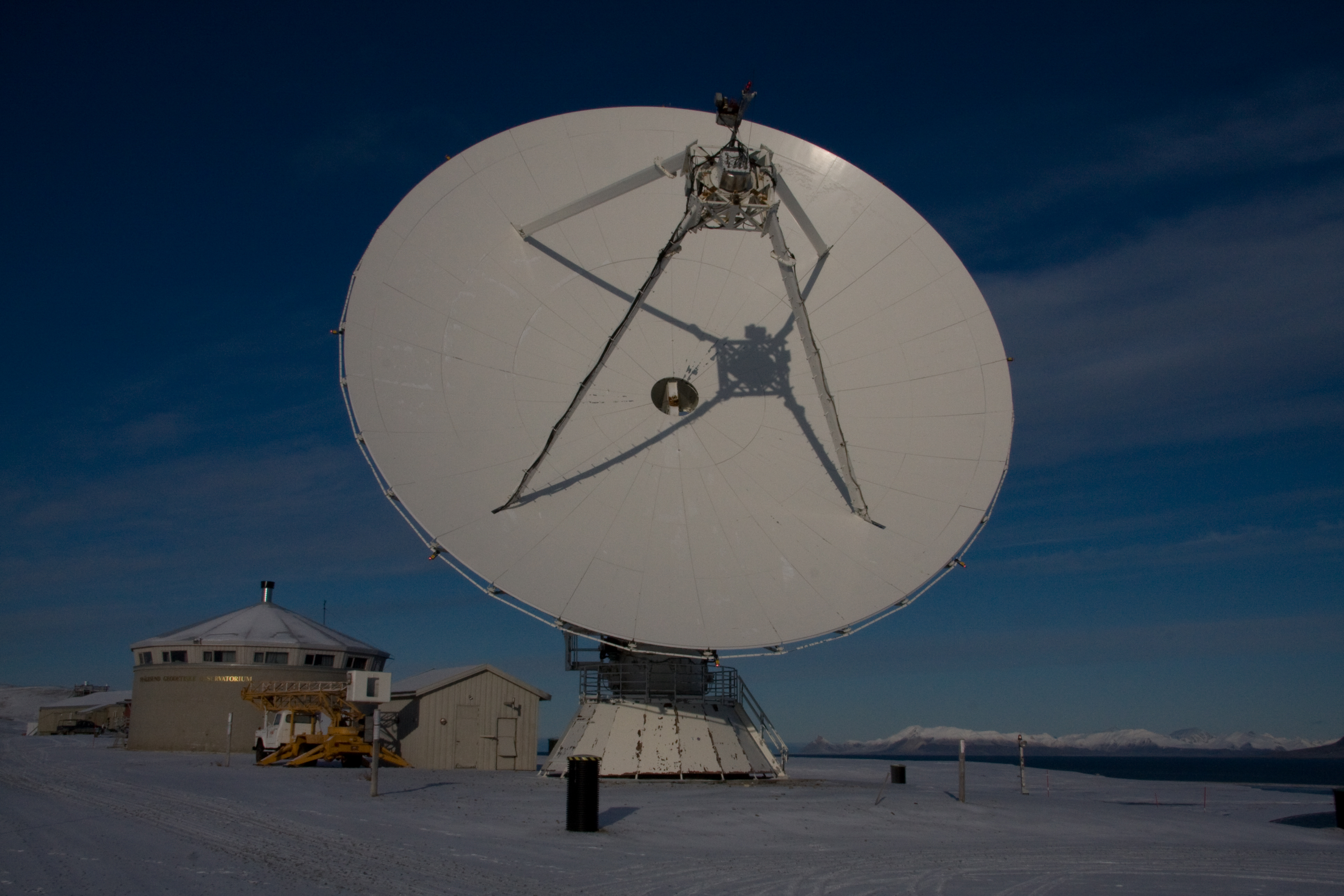
VLBI radio telescope.

Eighteen research institutions from eleven countries have a more or less permanent presence in Ny-Ålesund. Five of these have a year-round presence, while the others are active primarily during the spring-summer-autumn field season. In addition there are several institutions that carry out research without having a permanent presence. Most research is centered around environmental and earth sciences (atmosphere, glaciology, terrestrial ecology and marine research), taking advantage of the town's latitude, close access to pristine nature and relatively mild climate. Compared to other locations at such a latitude, Ny-Ålesund research station provides a well-developed infrastructure in terms of facilities, laboratories, access and communication. Ny-Ålesund is owned and operated by Kings Bay, which provides services to visiting scientists.

Representatives for the participating institutions meet in the Ny-Ålesund Science Managers' Committee (NySMAC) twice per year. NySMAC's main goals are to distribute information on existing research and provide input to the coordination and prioritising of future research and research infrastructure. The Svalbard Science Forum (SSF) is an agency that acts as an information and coordination facilitator for research throughout Svalbard. Based in Longyearbyen, it is chaired by the Research Council of Norway. Among SSF's tasks is the management of the Research in Svalbard (RiS) database, which contains information on all previous and ongoing research on the archipelago. Kings Bay participates in SSF and requires all researchers to register their projects with RiS. The Americans have a presence in the National Science Foundation funded group known as Svalbard REU, which conducts research on the surrounding glaciers annually.

The following is a list of all actors engaged in research and environmental monitoring on a permanent/semi-permanent basis in Ny-Ålesund. It states the name of the facility, the institute operating it, the nationality, the year the facility was established, and the nature of the research carried out.

Key institutions, Ny-Ålesund Research Station
Facility	Institution	Nationality	Est.	Research
Amundsen–Nobile	National Research Council of Italy	Italy	2009	Atmospheric
Arctic	University of Groningen	Netherlands	1995	Ecology and others
Arctic Yellow River	Chinese Arctic and Antarctic Administration	China	2004	Environment, glaciology, meteorology, marine ecosystems, meteorology, space–Earth measurements
British	British Antarctic Survey	United Kingdom	1991	Earth and life sciences
Corbel ‡	French Polar Institute Paul-Émile Victor	France	1963	Atmospheric sciences, hydrology, glaciology
Dasan	Korea Polar Research Institute	South Korea	2002	Atmospheric chemistry glacial and periglacial geomorphology and hydrology
Dirigibile Italia	National Research Council of Italy	Italy	1997	Environment and climate
Himadri	National Centre for Polar and Ocean Research	India	2008	Atmospheric sciences, marine ecosystems and pollution
Japanese	National Institute of Polar Research	Japan	1990	Atmospheric physics, glaciology, meteorology, oceanography and terrestrial biology
Koldewey ‡	Alfred Wegener Institute	Germany	1991	Atmospheric physics, biology, chemistry and geology. Part of the Total Carbon Column Observing Network.
Marine Laboratory	Kings Bay	Norway	2005	Marine biology
Rabot ‡	French Polar Institute Paul-Émile Victor	France	1999	Atmospheric and life sciences
Rocket Range	Andøya Rocket Range	Norway	1997	Sounding rockets
Sverdrup	Norwegian Polar Institute	Norway	1999	Various
VLBI	Norwegian Mapping Authority	Norway	1992	Very-long-baseline interferometry
Zeppelin	Norwegian Polar Institute	Norway	1988	Atmospheric

‡ The French and German activities are all part of the joint AWIPEV Arctic Research Station since 2003.

== Mining ==
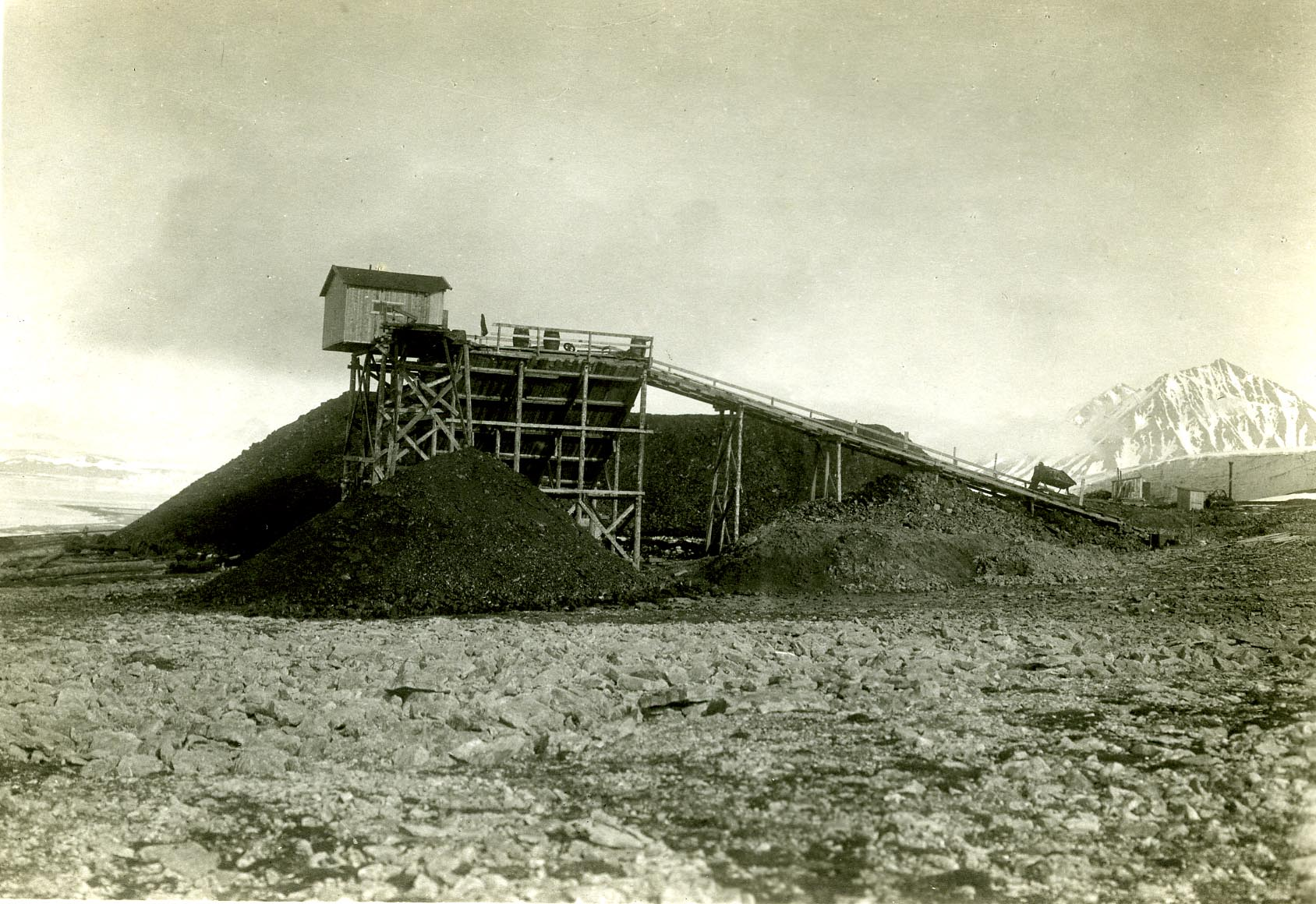
Kings Bay mining operations during the first years

The coal seams are located between the town-site and towards the mountain of Zeppelinfjellet. The coalfields are about 5 kilometers (3 mi) wide in the east–west orientation, and about 1.5 kilometers (1 mi) wide in the north–south direction. There are six seams, located at a ten to twenty degree angle towards the surface. The seam thickness varies from a few centimeters (about an inch) to 15 meters (49 ft). The varying thickness increased the complexity of mining. From the top the seams are named Ragnhil, Josefine, Otelie, Advokat, Sofie and Ester. Most of the latter three are located below sea level. Each shaft was named for the seam it connected to. The area has further been subdivided into areas: Eastern, Agnes, Eastern Center, Western Center, Western and Lagoon. Only three have seen production, the Agnes, Eastern Center and Western Center.

The coal layers are part of a Tertiary formation created 65 million years ago. It is classified as bituminous coal and cannel coal, with a high petroleum content (16–25 percent) and high sulphuric contents (2 percent). This is the same formation as the coal mines in Longyearbyen and Sveagruva, but the Ny-Ålesund layer has been shifted in relation to these.

== Transport and communications ==
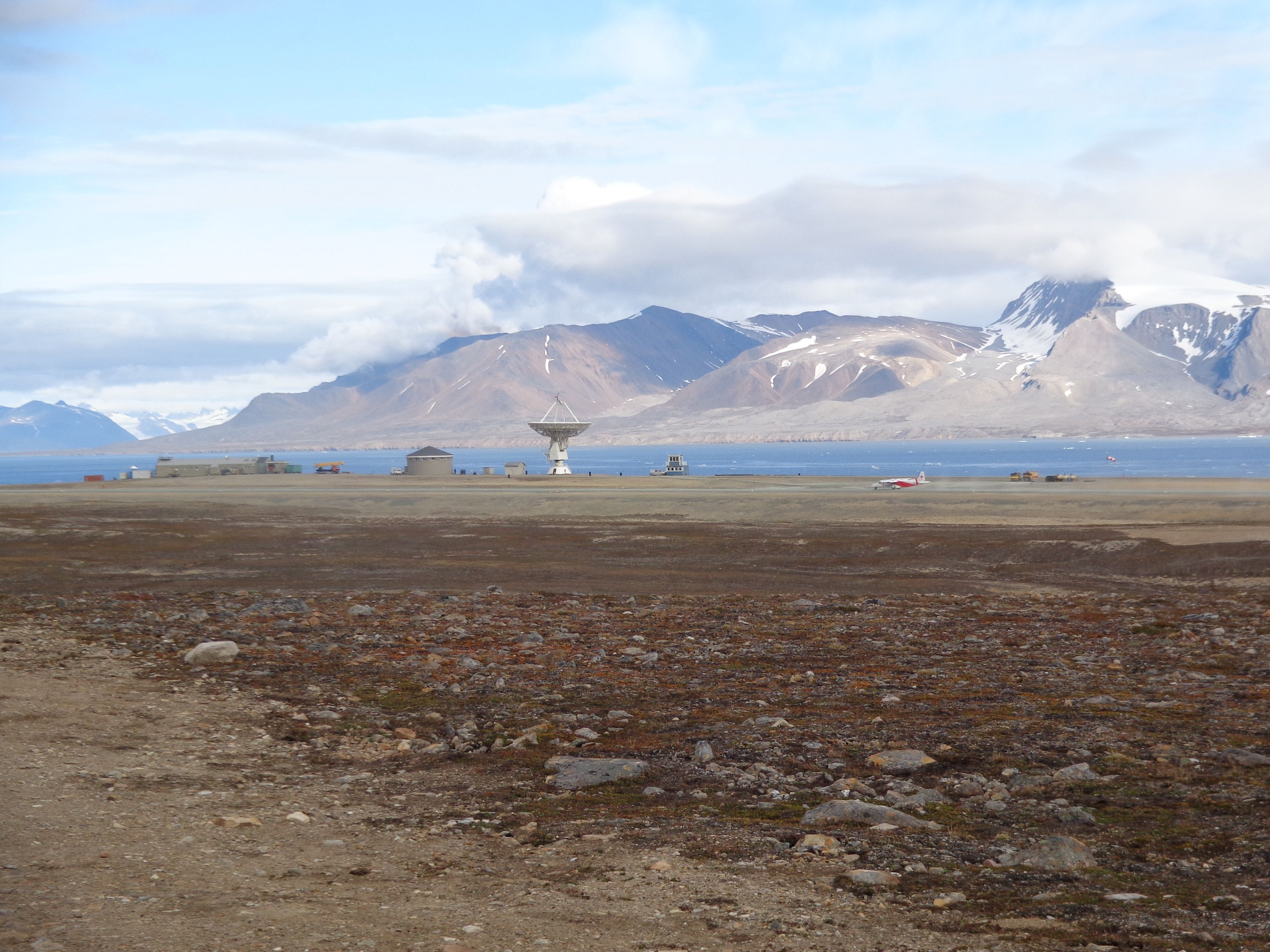
A Lufttransport Dornier 228 landing at Ny-Ålesund Airport, Hamnerabben

Ny-Ålesund has a road network that connects the buildings at the settlement, but this network does not extend beyond the settlement. Off-road motorized transport is prohibited on bare ground, but snowmobiles are used extensively during winter—both for commercial and recreational activities. Ny-Ålesund Harbour is operated by Kings Bay. In addition to serving the research community, it is open to commercial and recreational vessels. It has one large berth that is International Ship and Port Facility Security Code compliant and is commonly used by cruise ships. To reach the Zeppelin Station, located at 485-meter (1,591 ft) above mean sea level, there is an aerial tramway that runs up Zeppelinfjellet.

Ny-Ålesund Airport, Hamnerabben consists of a single 808-meter (2,651 ft) long and 30-meter (98 ft) wide gravel runway, located northwest of the settlement. It features a 30-by-75-meter (98 by 246 ft) apron and aerodrome flight information service, but lacks a terminal and hangar facilities. Kings Bay charters Lufttransport to fly two to four weekly flights using a Dornier 228 aircraft to Svalbard Airport, Longyear. Tickets are only available after permission from Kings Bay. Svalbard Rocket Range is a launch site for sounding rockets. Owned by Andøya Rocket Range, its high latitude makes it well-suited for launching rockets to investigate Earth's magnetic field. It is the world's northernmost launch site.

From the implementation of the Svalbard Undersea Cable System in 2003 Ny-Ålesund had a twin 155 megabits per second microwave connection to Longyearbyen. Two redundant fiber pairs were laid in 2014, increasing capacity to 10 gigabits per second. The fiber line is owned by Uninett and cost NOK 90 million (roughly €9.2 million) to install. The very-long-baseline interferometry station at Hamnerabben is sensitive to electromagnetic radiation in certain frequencies. Thus there is enforced a 20-kilometer (12 mi) exclusion zone for devices transmitting at between 2 and 32 GHz. The ban includes mobile telephones, Bluetooth, Wi-Fi and other wireless devices. Telenor Maritim Radio operates a VHF maritime radio transmitted in Ny-Ålesund, which is remotely controlled from Bodø Radio.

== Environment ==
Ny-Ålesund is located in a high-Arctic ecosystem within the tundra zone. It sits amid the richest fauna and flora areas of Svalbard, especially along the rim of Kongsfjord and particularly in its innermost parts. Some of the cliffs are heavily populated by birds; Ny-Ålesund is the archipelago's richest area for birds, especially waders. The Svalbard ptarmigan is the sole bird to winter. The vegetation is poor and vulnerable, mostly consisting of lichen. Mammals in the area include the Svalbard reindeer, the Arctic fox and the polar bear. All people in the settlement must carry rifles because of the bears, and all doors in town remain unlocked for the sake of people seeking cover in the event of an attack. There are three protected areas in the vicinity: Blomstrandhamna Bird Sanctuary, Kongsfjorden Bird Sanctuary and Ossian Sars Nature Reserve.

The climate is mild for its northern latitude, due to the North Atlantic Current, which flows northwards from mainland Norway up the west coast of Spitsbergen. It also receives heat from the predominant high pressure fronts that bring warm air from the Atlantic to the Barents Sea. The town has its lowest temperatures during March, at an average −12 °C (10 °F) and a high average of 6 °C (43 °F) during July. The sun does not set from 18 April to 24 August (midnight sun) and does not rise from 25 October to 17 February (polar night). But there is no nautical twilight between December 11 to December 30, it only has 24 hour of darkness called astronomical twilight. The site is sufficiently isolated that it can be used to measure the background pollution levels in the high Arctic troposphere. The town has some of the cleanest air in the world.

== Image gallery ==
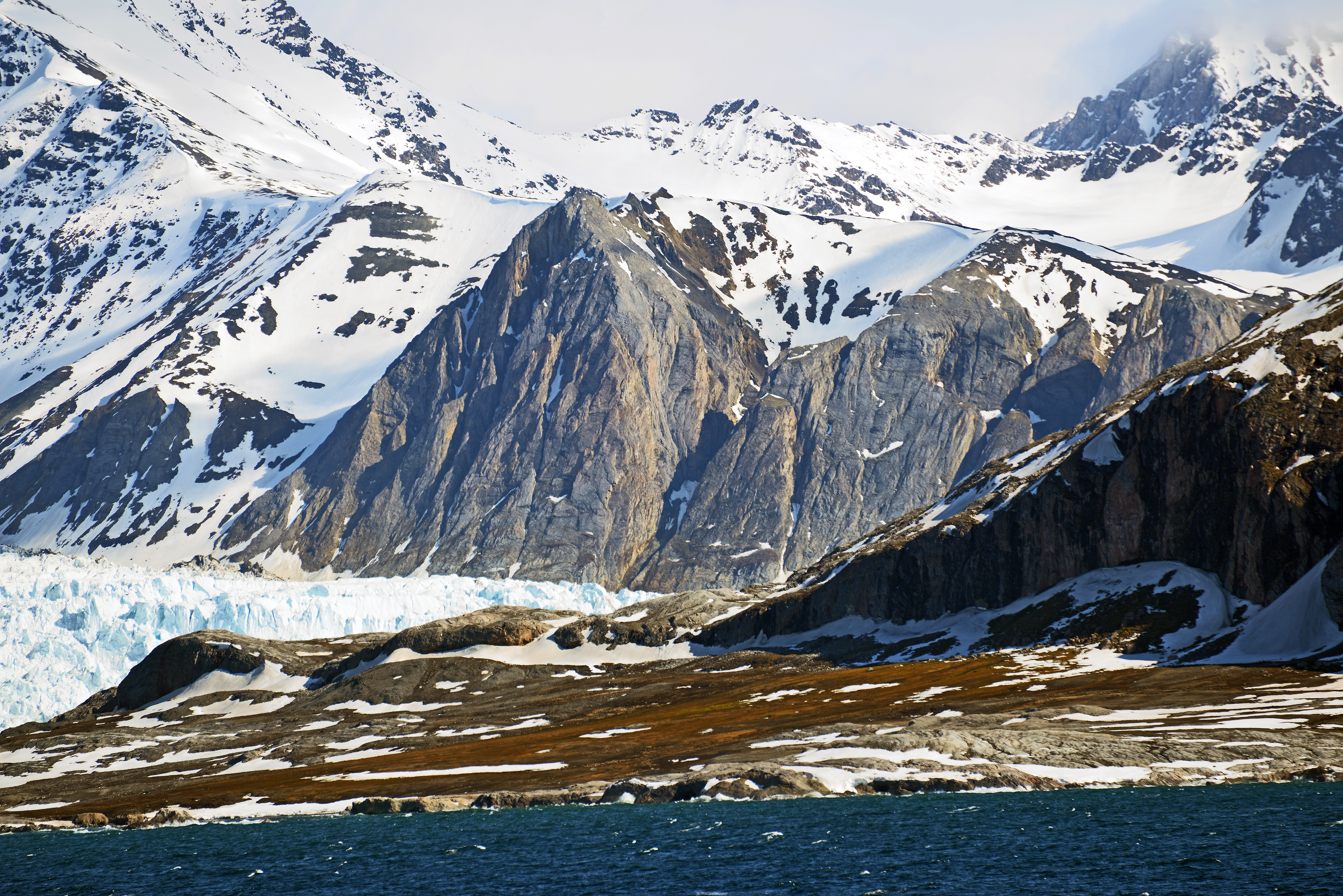

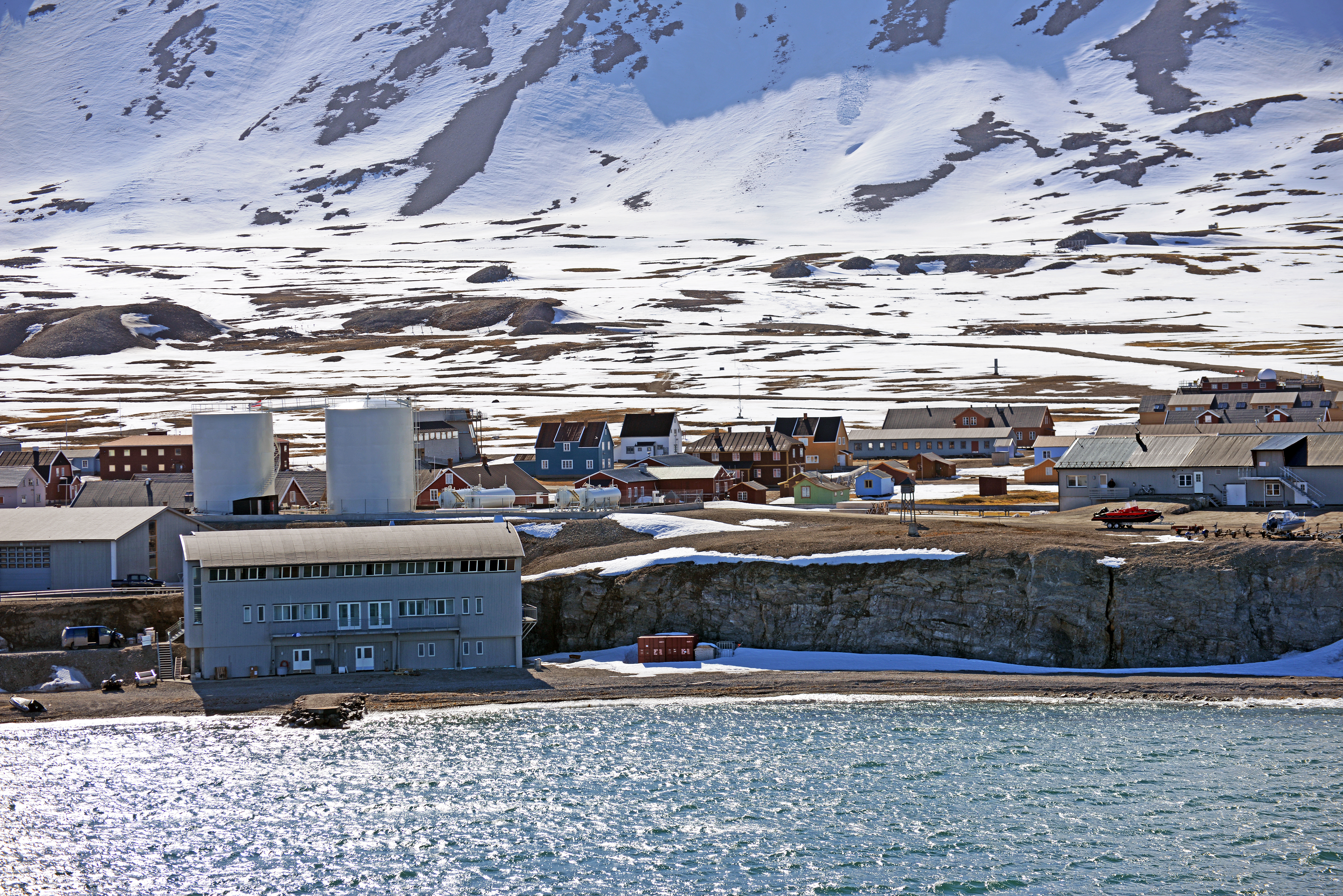

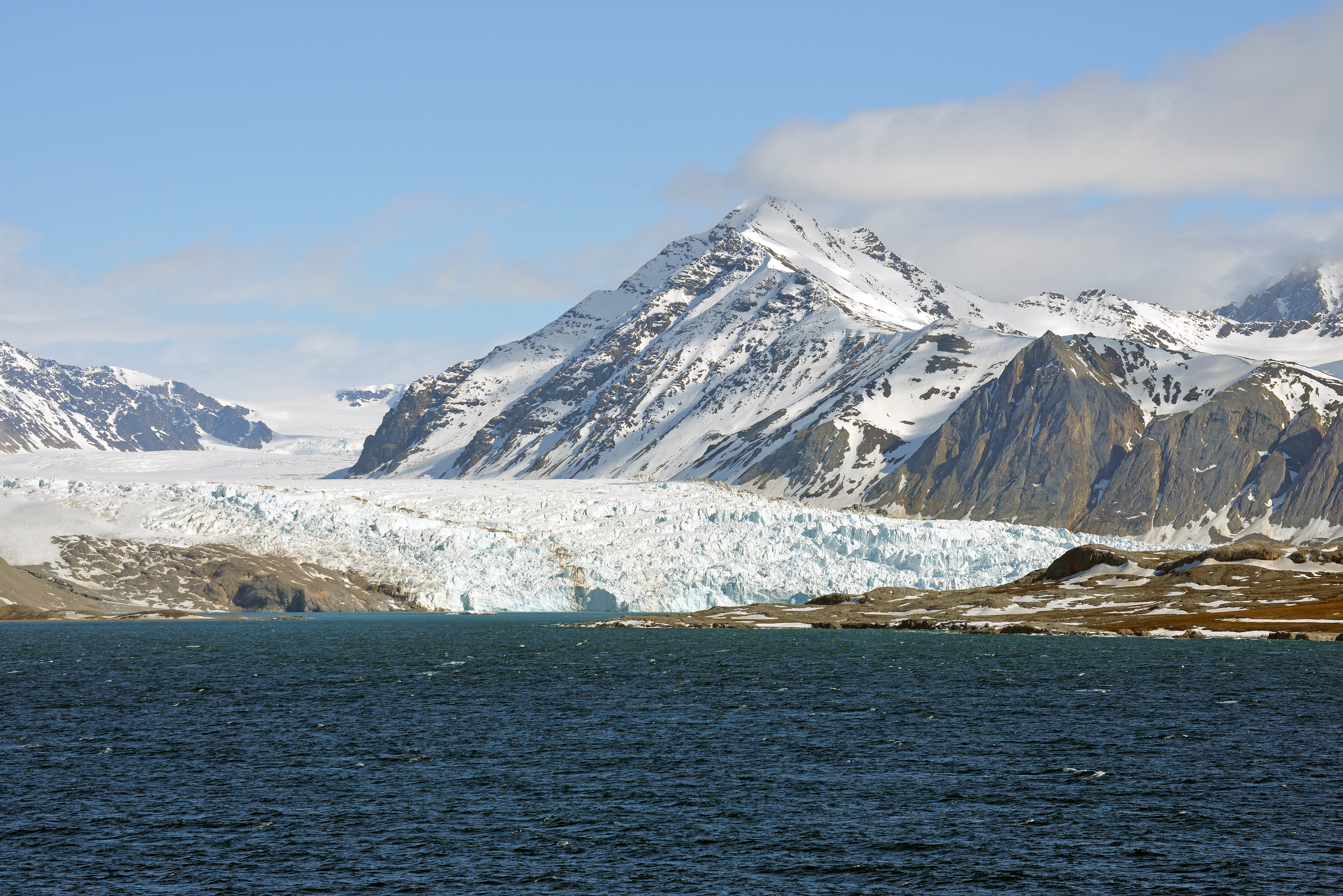

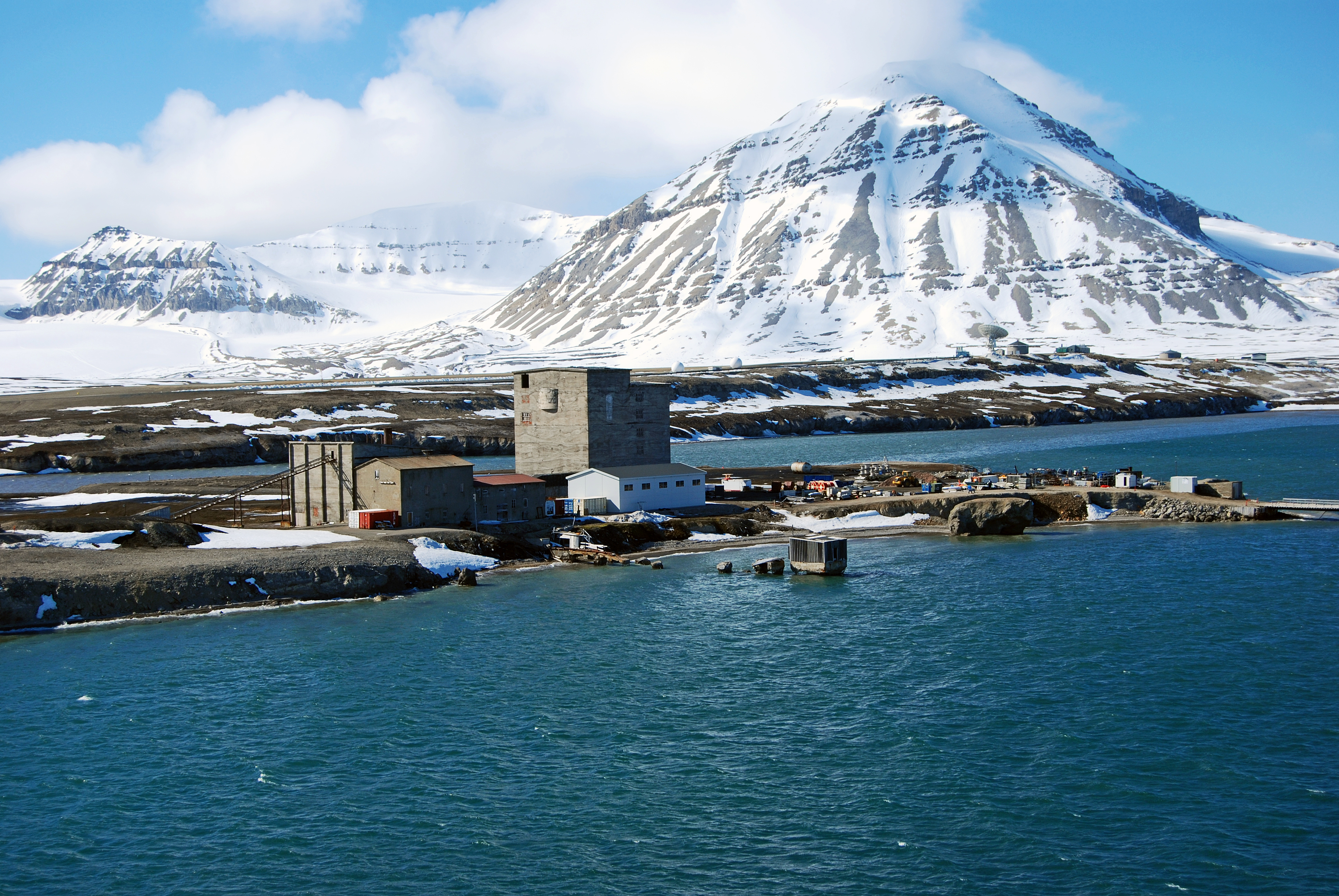

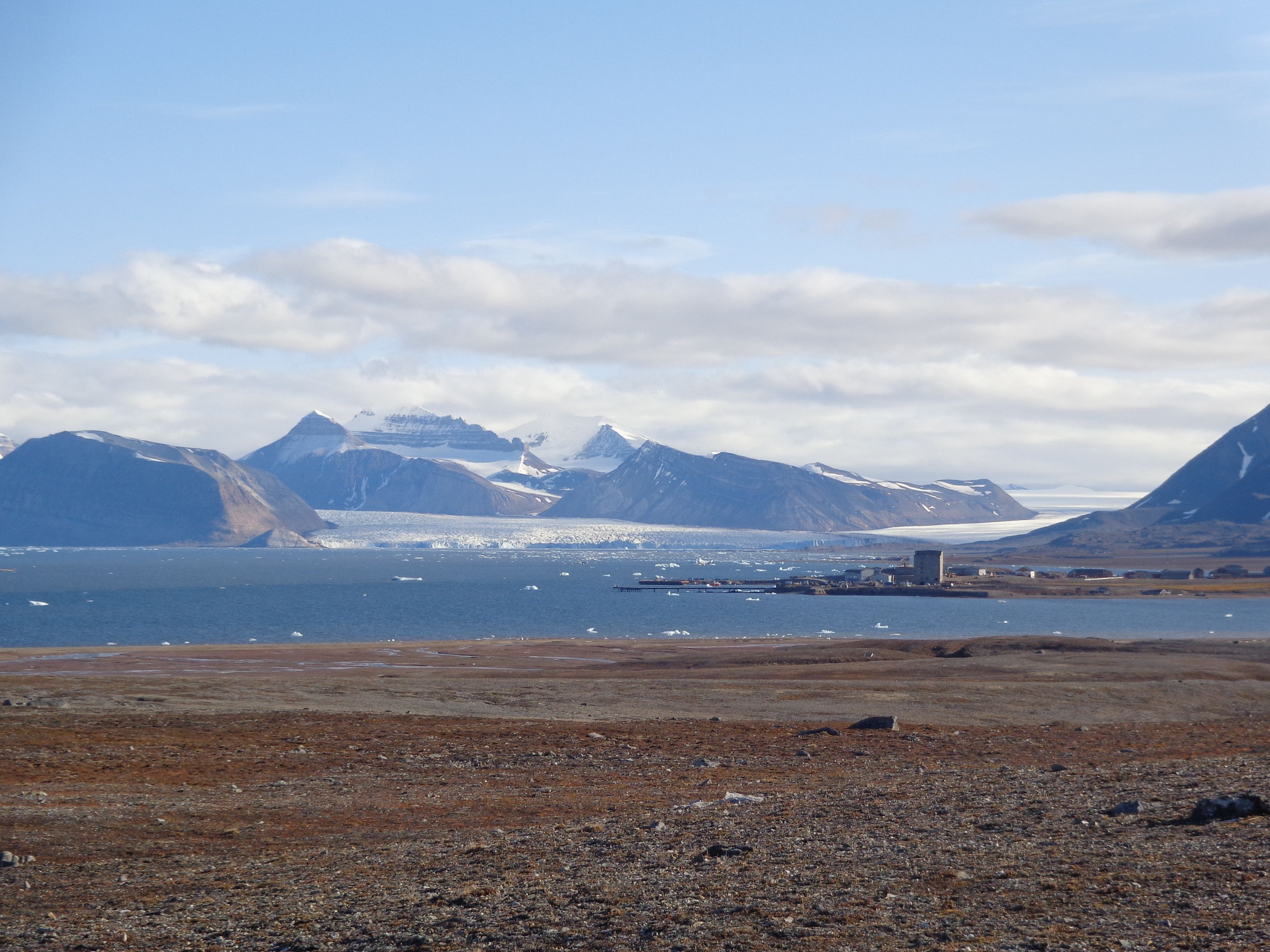

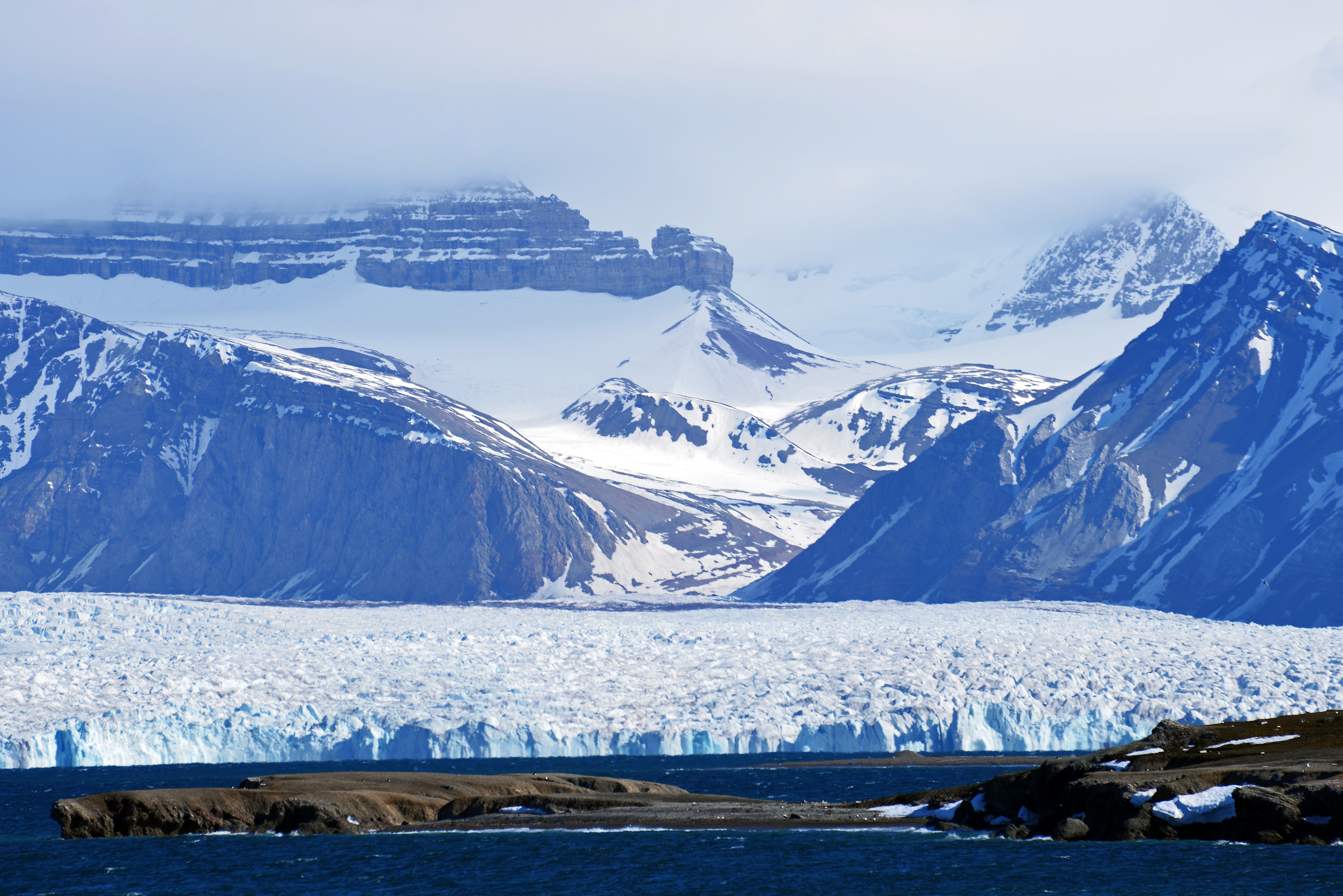

== See also ==
- List of research stations in the Arctic
- The Ny-Ålesund Symposium
