= Zeppelinfjellet =

Mountain in Svalbard, Norway

Coordinates: 78.906°N 11.882°E

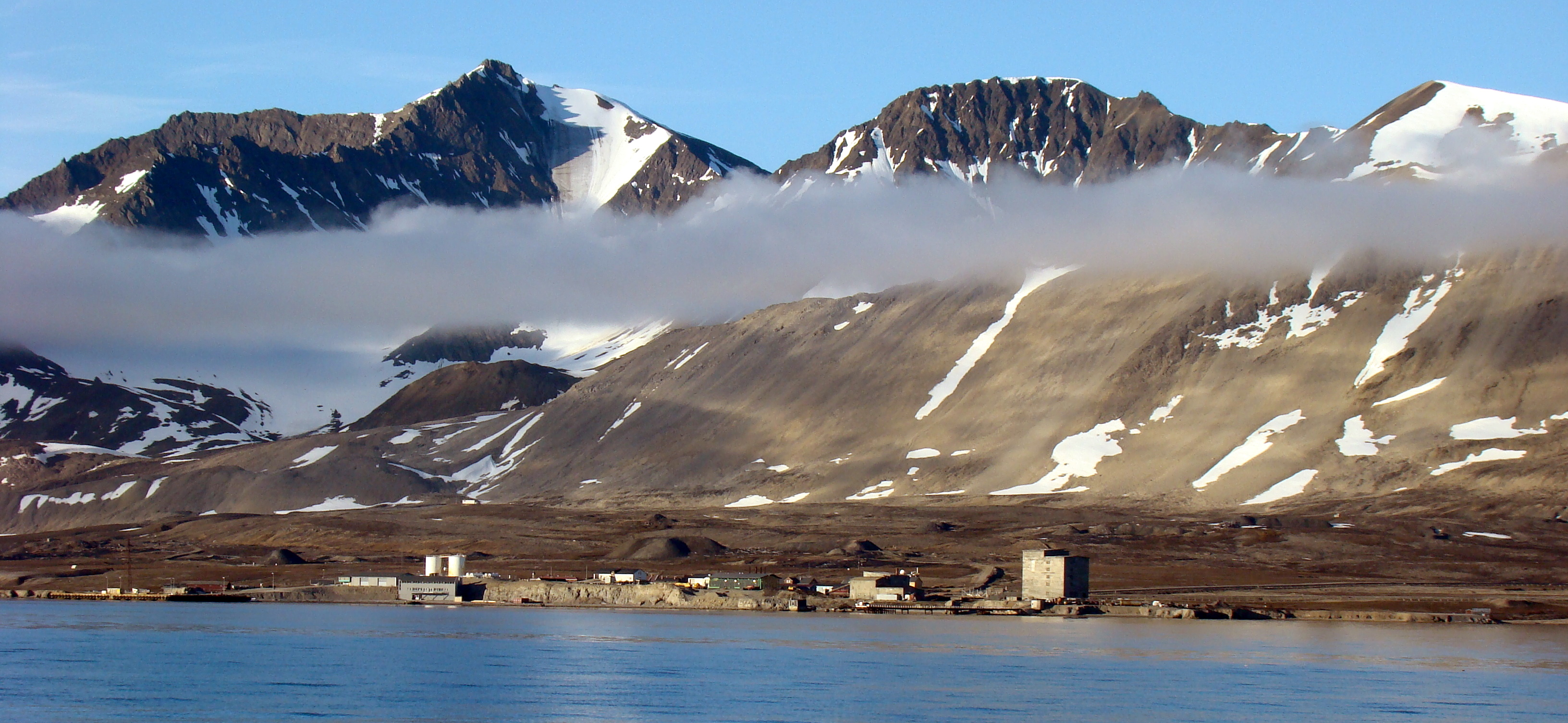

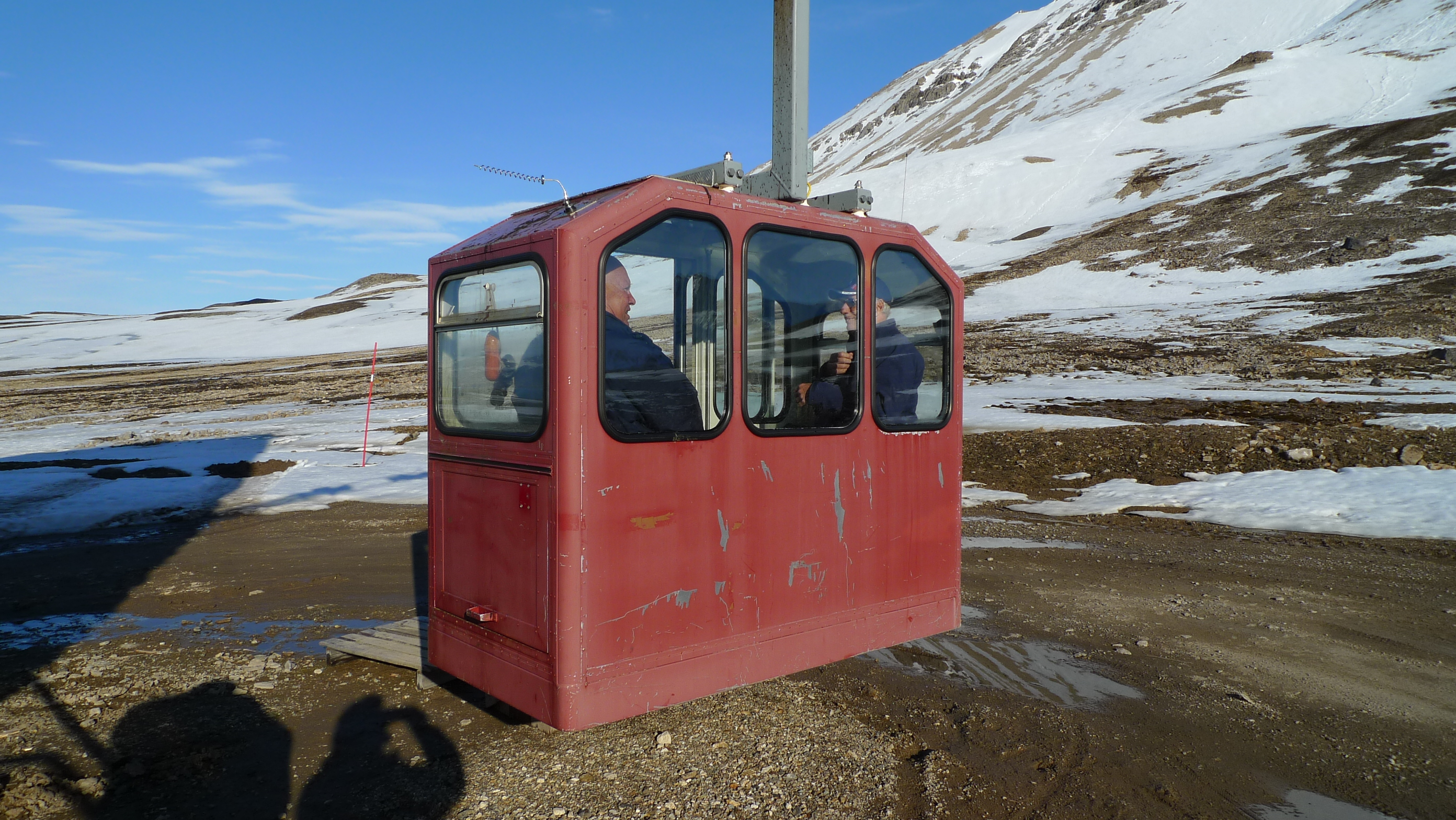
Cable car from Ny-Ålesund to Zeppelinfjellet

Zeppelinfjellet is a mountain in Oscar II Land at Spitsbergen, Svalbard. It reaches a height of 556 m.a.s.l. (1824 ft) and is located on the peninsula of Brøggerhalvøya, south of the former mining settlement of Ny-Ålesund and near Zeppelinhamna. The mountain is named after German military officer and airship designer Ferdinand von Zeppelin.
