= Ossian Sars Nature Reserve =

Nature reserve in Svalbard, Norway

- IUCN category Ia (strict nature reserve)
- Location: Svalbard, Norway
- Nearest city: Ny-Ålesund
- Coordinates: 78.94°N 12.43°E
- Area: 12.1 km^{2} (4.7 sq mi)
- Established: 26 September 2003
- Governing body: Norwegian Directorate for Nature Management

Ossian Sars Nature Reserve (Norwegian: Ossian Sars naturreservat) is located at the inner-most part of Kongsfjorden on Spitsbergen in Svalbard, Norway. It was created on 26 September 2003 to preserve the mountain Ossian Sarsfjellet and the surrounding vegetation, although it had been protected as a plant conservatory area in 1984 The nature reserve covers 12.139 square kilometers. Hiking is permitted, but tenting is not.

The mountain and reserve are named after biologist Georg Ossian Sars.
