= Kvadehuksletta =

Plain in Svalbard, Norway

Coordinates: 78.97°N 11.46°E

Kvadehuksletta is a plain located on the outermost part of the peninsula of Brøggerhalvøya on the west coast of the island of Spitsbergen in Svalbard, Norway. It takes its name after Kvadehuken, the outermost part of the peninsula. It is again a Norwegianization of the Dutch "Quade hoek", which means bad corner.

During the late 1950s and early 1960s, Norsk Polar Navigasjon proposed building an airport at Kvadehuksletta.
