= Aalesunds Kreditbank =

Former commercial banks in Ålesund, Norway

Aalesunds Kreditbank was a commercial-bank name used in Ålesund, Norway. The original bank was established in 1877 as the first commercial bank in Ålesund. It suspended payments in March 1922 and was subsequently liquidated under public administration. A later bank, Aalesunds Nye Kreditbank A/S, was established in 1931, subsequently used the shorter name Aalesunds Kreditbank A/S, and merged with three other regional banks in 1952 to form Sunnmøre Kreditbank.

Contemporary records distinguish the two institutions. A 1931 parliamentary case described the original Aalesunds Kreditbank as being "in liquidation under public administration", while advertisements issued by the later bank stated that it had been established in 1931.

== History ==
=== Original bank, 1877–1922 ===
Aalesunds Kreditbank began operations in 1877 with authorised share capital of 500,000 kroner, of which 150,000 kroner had been paid in. An official county report stated that the bank incurred a substantial loss during its first year and consequently paid no dividend. By the end of 1880, it held 422,882 kroner in current and savings deposits, had accumulated 22,000 kroner in reserve and loan-loss funds, and paid a dividend of 5 per cent.

The bank expanded substantially during the late 19th century. In 1895 its annual cash turnover exceeded 9 million kroner and its deposits totalled approximately 1.86 million kroner. An official report recorded annual net earnings of between 36,700 and 49,500 kroner during the period from 1891 to 1895. The bank paid an 8 per cent dividend for 1891 and dividends of 10 per cent in the following years.

A commercial directory published in 1909 recorded share capital of 823,200 kroner, with authority to increase it to 1 million kroner, and named Jacob Jervell as the bank's managing director.

Following the Ålesund fire of 1904, the architectural firm of Christian and Hans Backer Fürst designed new premises for the bank at Korsegata 8. Surviving architectural plans identify Aalesunds Kreditbank as the client.

=== Suspension and liquidation ===
Aalesunds Kreditbank suspended payments on 30 March 1922. A public notice announcing the suspension appeared in Sunnmørsposten the following day.

The bank remained in liquidation for several years. In 1931 the Storting considered a proposal concerning the sale of the Norwegian state's frozen deposit in the liquidation estate and the state's purchase of the bank's claim against Kings Bay Kul Compani. The civil servant and banking inspector Anders Frihagen served as manager of Aalesunds Kreditbank in 1931 and 1932 while it was under public administration.

=== Later bank, 1931–1952 ===
Aalesunds Nye Kreditbank A/S was established in 1931. A 1948 advertisement described the bank as having been established that year and reported combined share capital and funds of 3.15 million kroner.

By 1952, the bank was advertising under the shorter name Aalesunds Kreditbank A/S while continuing to state that it had been established in 1931. At that time it reported share capital of 2 million kroner and reserves of 1.75 million kroner.

Ola Skjåk Bræk became managing director of Aalesunds Nye Kreditbank in 1950. In 1952 he arranged its merger with Møre Kreditbank, Ørsta Aksjebank and Søndmøre Fiskeri- og Handelsbank. The resulting institution was named Sunnmøre Kreditbank and has been described as Norway's first regional bank.

Sunnmøre Kreditbank merged with Privatbanken in Ålesund in 1975 to form Sunnmørsbanken.

== Bibliography ==
- Rødven, Per O. (1999). Møre Kreditbank A/S (in Norwegian). Volda: Kredittkassen. ISBN 82-994995-1-8.
- Thorson, Odd (1952). Ålesund 1848–1948: økonomisk og kommunal historie (in Norwegian). Vol. 2: 1904–1948. Oslo: Fabritius & Sønners Trykkeri.
