= Kings Bay Affair =

1963 political scandal in Norway

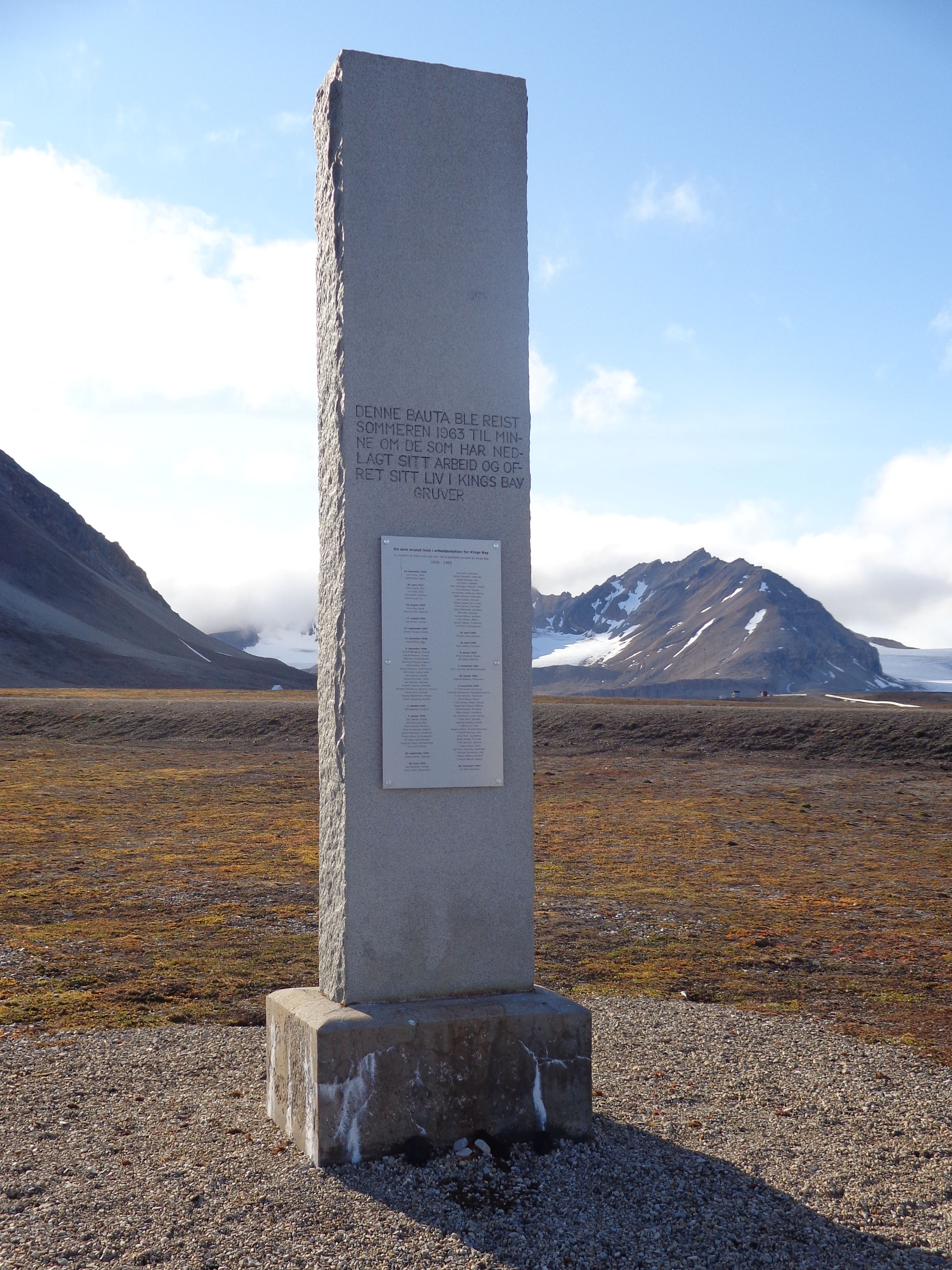
Memorial at Kings Bay in Svalbard

The Kings Bay Affair (Kings Bay-saken) was a political issue in Norway that reached its apex in 1963 and brought down the government of Einar Gerhardsen and formed the basis for non-socialist coalition politics in Norway that persisted to the end of the 20th century. The affair was a dramatic episode in Norwegian history that portended the end of the Gerhardsen dynasty and the emergence of a more articulate and coherent political alternative in the non-socialist camp. It is also credited with galvanizing the radical socialist wing of Norwegian politics in time for the EU debate nine years later.

== History ==
The Kings Bay Coal Mining Company was a coal mining operation based in Ny-Ålesund on the Norwegian territory of Svalbard in the Arctic Ocean. Since 1933 it had been a wholly owned crown company, held by the Norwegian government.

Between 1945 and 1963, 71 people died in three major accidents in the mines. On November 5, 1962, a mining accident at Kings Bay mines killed 21 miners in an explosion. In response, the Storting established an investigatory commission in the summer of 1963. The commission's report found several deficiencies in the management of the mine. Among other things, it found culpability on the part of the minister of industry at the time, Kjell Holler.

The non-socialist opposition to the Labour Party government demanded that Holler be dismissed, but prime minister Einar Gerhardsen claimed that Kings Bay operations were not accountable to the parliament, since the company was run under a corporate charter rather than a government agency. This was the pretext, but the underlying issue was constitutional: the non-socialist coalition was protesting against what they perceived as a shift of power away from the legislative in favour of the executive branch in Norway. Having previously enjoyed the confidence of a Labour-dominated parliament since World War II, Gerhardsen was, for the first time in his entire tenure as prime minister, forced to appear before the parliament and answer for his cabinet's actions.

The opposition, previously fragmented, found unity in proposing a vote of no-confidence to the parliament on the rationale that if shareholders can unseat a board for a corporation, then a government that owns a corporation that is mismanaged must be similarly held accountable. For understandable reasons, the Labour Party representatives were not inclined to support the vote. Since the non-socialist coalition and the Labour Party each had 74 of the total 150 representatives, the deciding vote fell to the two representatives of the leftist socialist party Sosialistisk Folkeparti.

In an interesting parliamentary twist, Sosialistisk Folkeparti (SF) proposed its own vote of no-confidence, which led to the Gerhardsen cabinet's resignation. Technically, the SF representatives were trying to make the point that they had lost confidence in the current cabinet but not in the party that led it. A photograph, published by Aftenposten, of Gerhardsen leaving the lectern at the Storting as John Lyng approaches it, the two crossing paths, has become an icon in Norwegian political history.

The non-socialist cabinet formed by John Lyng of the Conservative Party of Norway was the first non-Labour government in Norway after World War II, but it lasted for only a few weeks. Its initial declaration failed to survive a vote of no-confidence from the Labour Party and Sosialistisk Folkeparti.

== Other sources ==
- Kristensen, Monica (2013) Kings Bay-saken (Forlaget Press) ISBN 9788275476355
