= Kings Bay (company) =

Norwegian state-owned company

Kings Bay AS
- Type: State owned
- Industry: Infrastructure
- Founded: 1916
- Headquarters: Ny-Ålesund, Norway
- Area served: Svalbard
- Key people: Ole Charles Ryder Øiseth (CEO)
- Revenue: ▲36.8 million kr (2005)
- Net income: 0.2 million kr (2005)
- Number of employees: 32 (2007)
- Parent: Norwegian Ministry of Trade and Industry

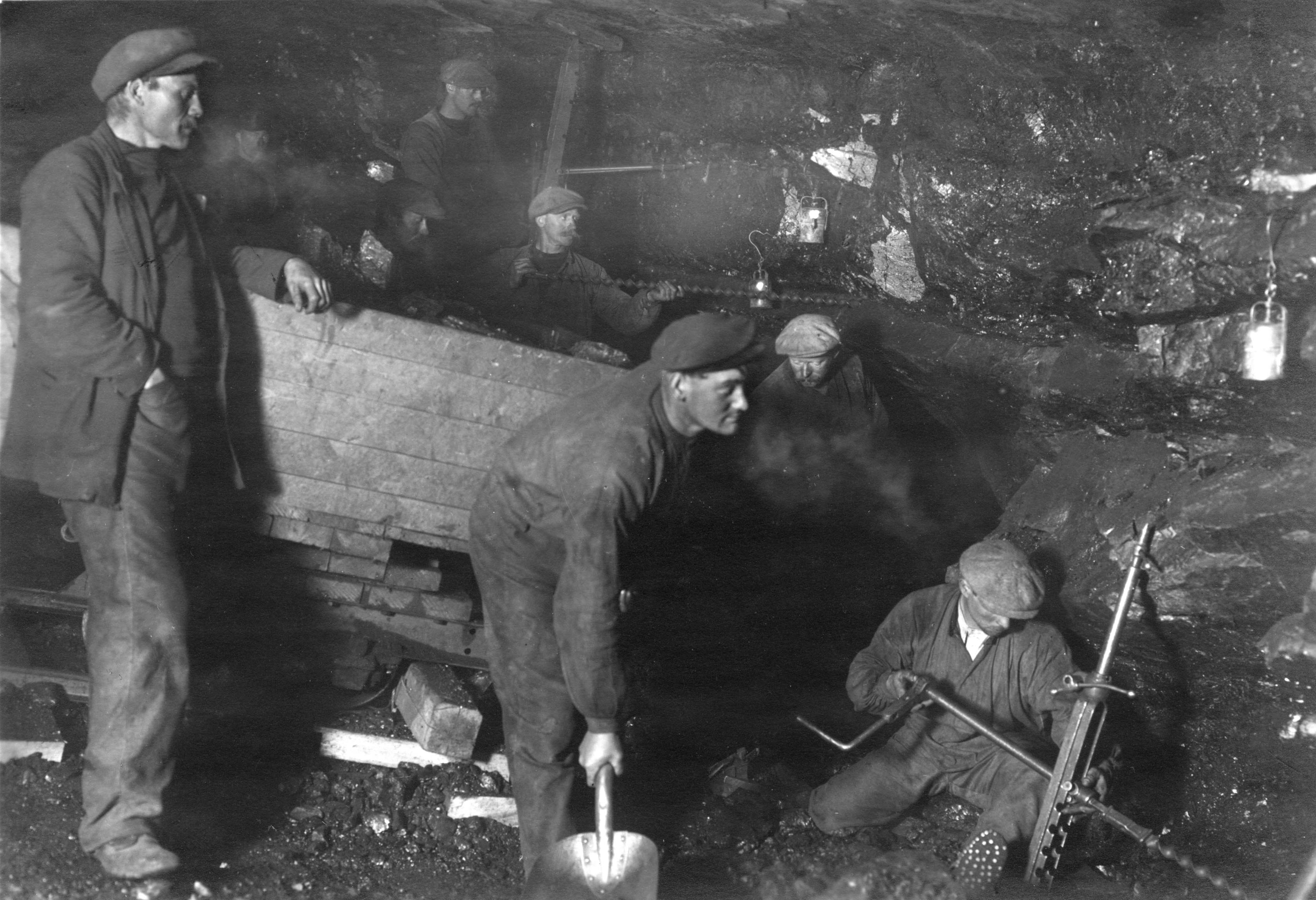
In the mine Agnes Credit: Sigvald Moa

Kings Bay AS is a government enterprise owned by the Norwegian Ministry of Trade and Industry that operates the entire settlement of Ny-Ålesund on Svalbard. The settlement, the most northerly civilian settlement in the world, serves research staff. The company provides the necessary infrastructure, such as transport (including the airport Ny-Ålesund Airport, Hamnerabben), real estate, power and water supply, catering and other facilities. The company is also responsible for administering Bjørnøen AS, a government enterprise that owns the entire island of Bjørnøya. In the summer the company also handles cruise ships that arrive at Ny-Ålesund.

The company was founded in 1916 as Kings Bay Kull Company with the intention of operating a coal mine. It was later nationalized, and in 1962 the mine closed in the context of a political crisis in Norway known as the Kings Bay Affair (Kings Bay-saken). A research facility was subsequently set up in at Ny-Ålesund, to be run by the company. From 1964 to 1974, through an agreement with the European Space Research Organisation (ESRO), the island housed a Norwegian satellite telemetry station. Kings Bay resumed primary responsibility for facilities operations in 1974. In the 1990s, research activities expanded in Ny-Ålesund. In 1998 Kings Bay Kull Compani AS changed its name to Kings Bay AS, removing the final reference to coal.

Ny-Ålesund has been the starting point for many famous polar expeditions, including Roald Amundsen’s and Umberto Nobile’s journey to the North Pole.
