= Brøggerhalvøya =

Peninsula in Svalbard, Norway

Coordinates: 78.9°N 11.8°E

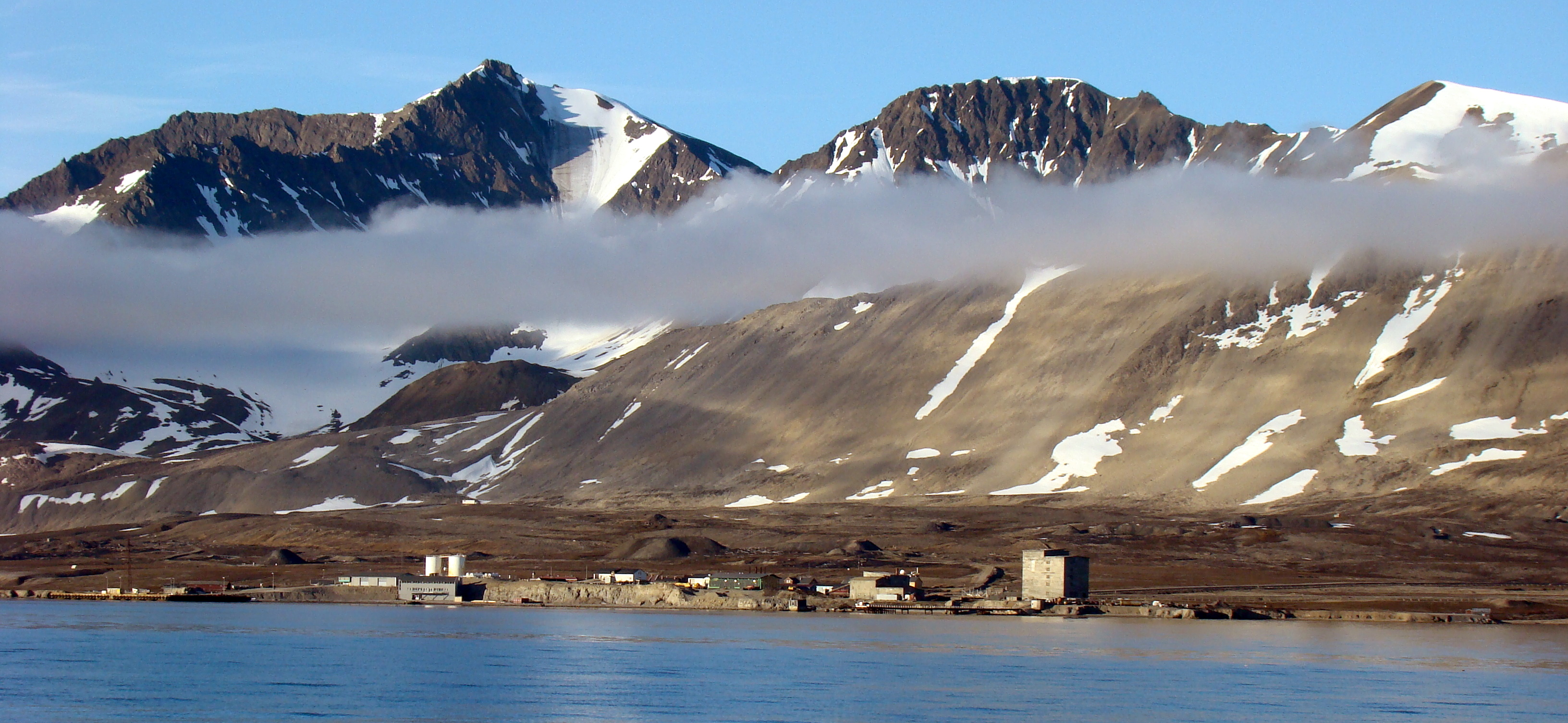
Ny-Ålesund

Brøggerhalvøya is a peninsula in Oscar II Land on the west coast of the island of Spitsbergen in Svalbard, Norway. It is 20 kilometers (12 mi) long and 10 kilometers (6.2 mi) wide and borders Kongsfjorden to the north and Forlandsundet to the west. Ny-Ålesund, the world's northernmost permanent settlement, is located on the peninsula, which is named for Waldemar Christopher Brøgger.

The Norwegian Polar Institute placed reindeer on the peninsula in 1978. Their grazing had a negative impact on the frail but biologically rich area, reducing the biodiversity.

The peninsula has a similar geology to Ny-Ålesund, Carboniferous and Permian, but is unaffected by coal wastes, which made the peninsula act as a control area. Melting ice since the last glacial period has resulted in the preservation of a superb raised beach sequence. Today, glaciers across the Peninsula have continued to experience a long-term decline in volume of ice and length since monitoring experiments began in the 1960s, a result of warming in the 20th century.
