= Transport in Svalbard =

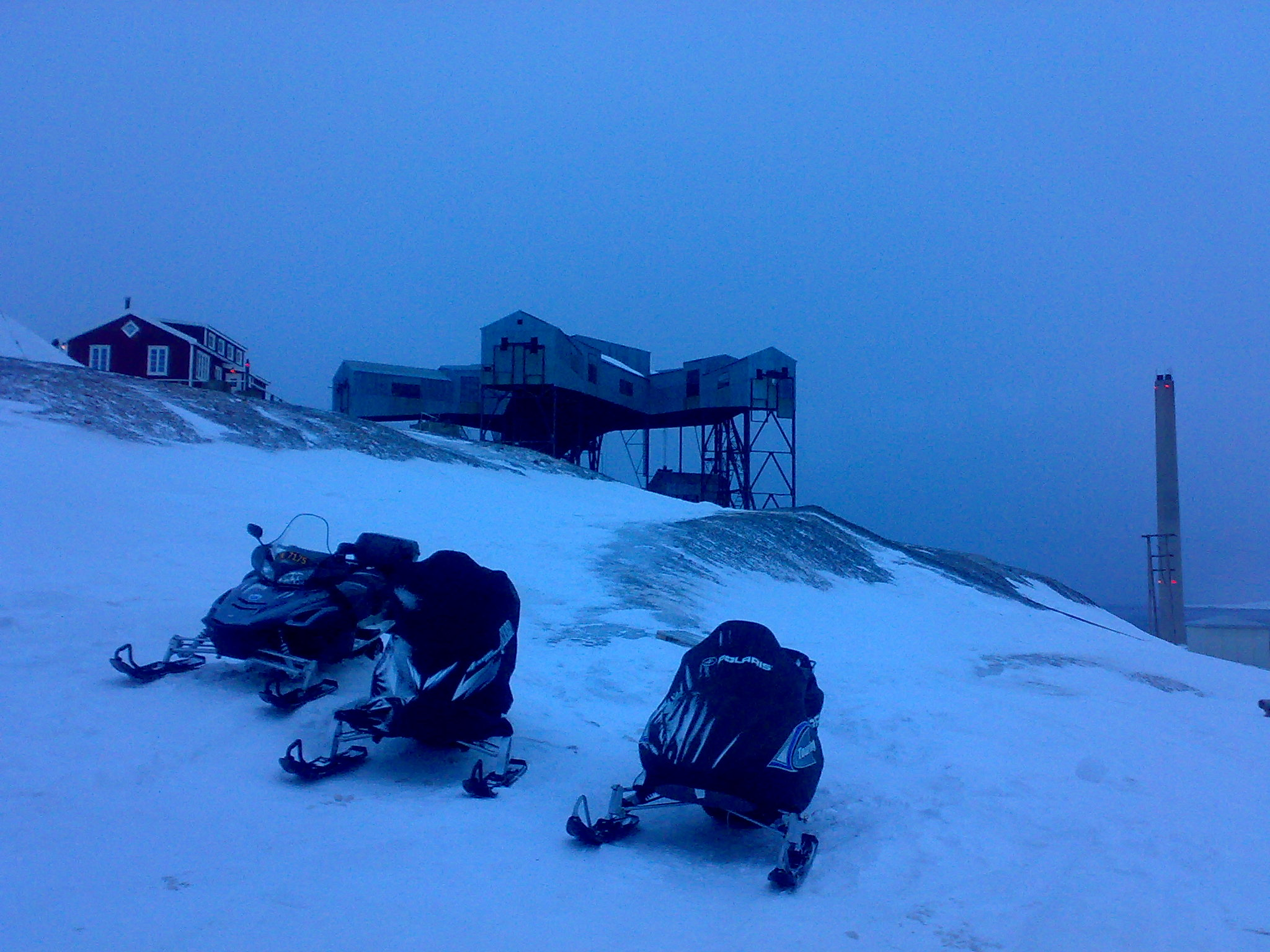
Snowmobiles at Longyearbyen; abandoned mine shaft in the background

Svalbard, Norway, is a vast, very sparsely inhabited Arctic archipelago. With fewer than 3,000 inhabitants in three main communities, plus some smaller meteorological and scientific outposts, there are no communities connected by road. Off-road motorized transport is prohibited on bare ground, but snowmobiles are used extensively during winter, both for commercial and recreational activities. Transport from Longyearbyen to Barentsburg (45 km or 28 mi) and Pyramiden (100 km or 62 mi) is possible by snowmobile at winter, or by ship all year round. Road systems exist within the communities of Longyearbyen, Barentsburg, Ny-Ålesund and the now-closed Sveagruva. All settlements have ports and Longyearbyen has a bus system.

== Aviation ==
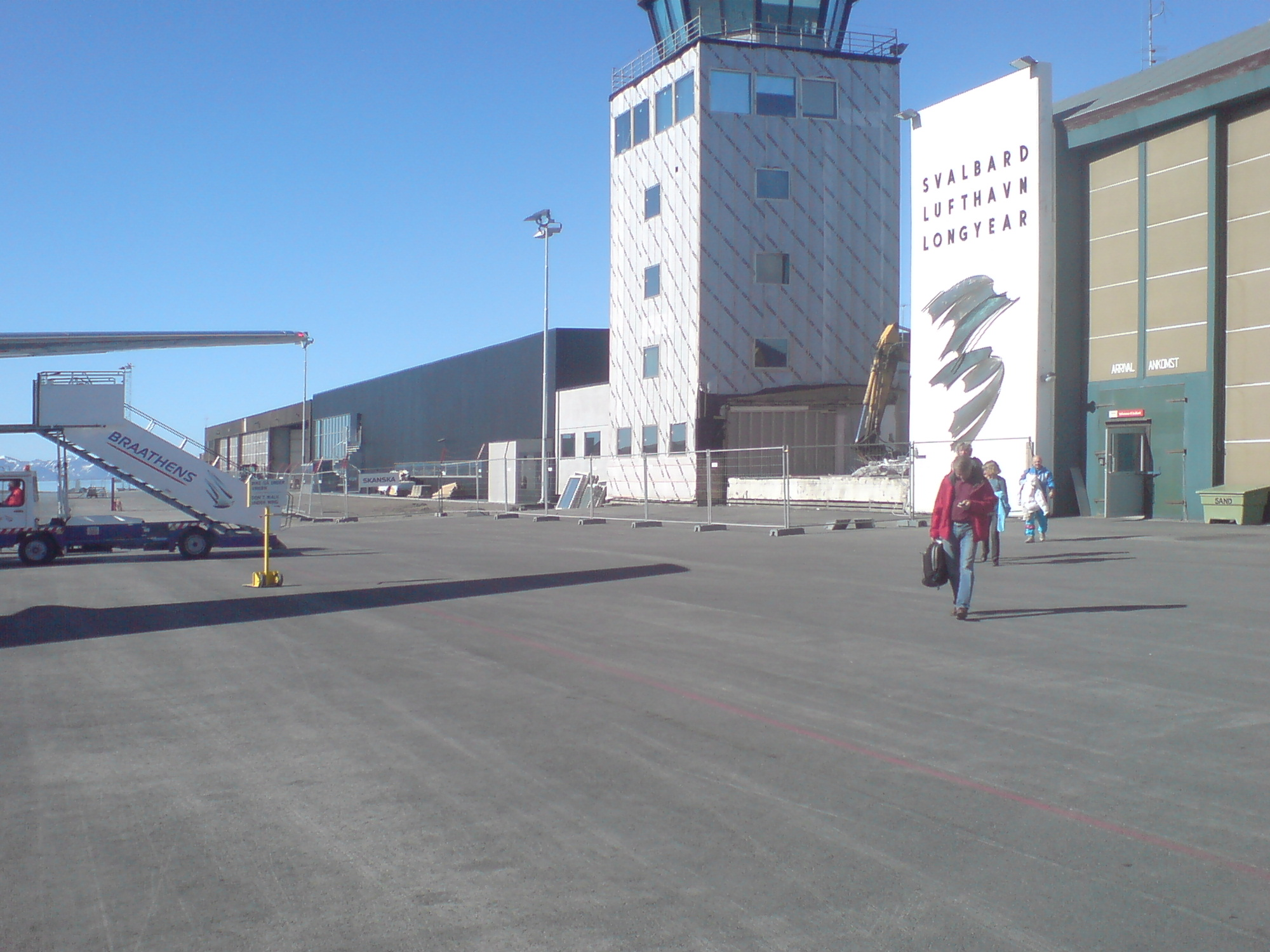
Svalbard Airport, Longyear

There are three airports in the Svalbard area, Svalbard Airport, Ny-Ålesund Airport and Svea Airport.

Svalbard Airport, Longyear is the main airport serving the archipelago. Located 3 kilometres (2 mi) northwest of Longyearbyen, it is the northernmost airport in the world with public scheduled flights. The first airport (or more accurately airstrip) near Longyearbyen (in Adventdalen) was constructed during World War II by the Luftwaffe, it was the first airstrip on Svalbard. It was first put into use for occasional flights in 1959, but could only be operated a few months a year. Construction of the new airport at Hotellneset started in 1973, and the airport was opened on 2 September 1975. It is owned and operated by state-owned Avinor. In 2009, the airport had 138,934 passengers. Scandinavian Airlines System operates daily flights to Tromsø and Oslo on mainland Norway. Lufttransport provides services to Ny-Ålesund Airport and Svea Airport, using Dornier 228 turboprop aircraft. There are also regular charter flights. On 29 August 1996, Vnukovo Airlines Flight 2801 crashed into Operafjellet mountain about 14 kilometres (8.7 mi) from the airport. All 141 people on board the Tupolev Tu-154M were killed. It is the worst air crash in Norwegian history.

Arktikugol, the owner of the company town of Barentsburg, operates a Mil Mi-8 helicopter from the heliport at Heerodden, 2 kilometres (1 mi) outside of town, as well as a heliport at their former town of Pyramiden. During the Cold War, Aeroflot retained a large helicopter base at Heerodden, operating five Mi-8 which could quickly be retrofitted with arms, plus regular staff both at Svalbard Airport (for occasional charter flights) and Heerodden. In 2006, one helicopter was lost in the Heerodden helicopter accident.

== Railways ==
Narrow-gauge mining railways used to operate at a number of locations, in particular at Ny-Ålesund and Grumant (built by the Norwegians and Soviets respectively). Most of these railways have been abandoned, but the one at Barentsburg was reported as still functional in 2008.
