= Tromsø Airport =

Tromsø Airport Tromsø lufthavn

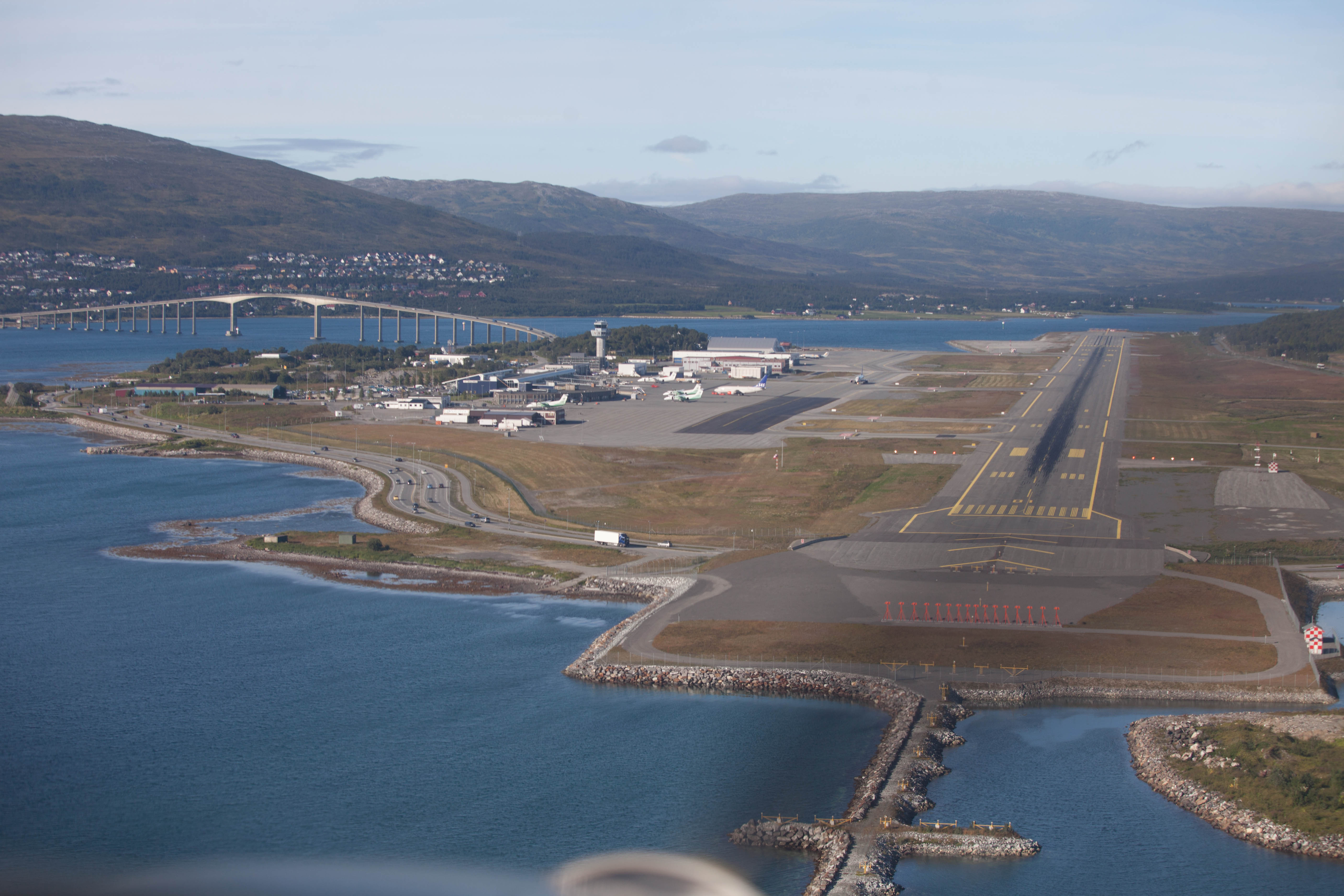
- IATA: TOS; ICAO: ENTC

Summary
- Airport type: Public
- Owner/Operator: Avinor
- Serves: Tromsø, Norway
- Location: Langnes, Troms, Norway
- Focus city for: Lufttransport
- Operating base for: Widerøe
- Elevation AMSL: 10 m (33 ft)
- Coordinates: 69°40′53″N 018°55′04″E
- Website: Official website

Map
- Location within Norway

Runways
Direction	Length		Surface
Direction	m	ft	Surface
18/36	2,447	8,028	Asphalt

Statistics (2015)
- Passengers: 2,009,146
- Aircraft movements: 42,444
- Cargo (tonnes): 2,758

Tromsø Airport (Norwegian: Tromsø lufthavn; IATA: TOS, ICAO: ENTC) is an international airport located at Langnes, Troms, Norway, that serves the city of Tromsø, Norway. Situated on the western shore of the island of Tromsøya, it features a 2,447-meter (8,028 ft) runway aligned 18/36. Owned and operated by the state-owned Avinor, Langnes handled 1,910,692 passengers, 43,219 aircraft movements and 2,758 tonnes of cargo in 2014. This makes Tromsø the fifth-busiest airport in the country and 11th busiest in the Nordic countries.

The airport opened on 14 September 1964, replacing Tromsø Airport, Skattøra, a water aerodrome. Tromsø became and still is the main hub for Widerøe's regional flights to Finnmark. Main haul flights to other primary airports were carried out by Scandinavian Airlines (SAS). Braathens SAFE and its Busy Bee subsidiary operated from Tromsø from 1967 to 2002. Norwegian Air Shuttle has flown from Langnes since 1992 and Lufttransport has its main operating base at Tromsø. The current Terminal B was built in 1977. Terminal A opened in 1997, following a period with a 240-meter (790 ft) runway extension and a new control tower.

== History ==
=== Establishment ===
The first airport in Tromsø was a water aerodrome at Skattøra, located in the neighboring Tromsøysund Municipality (which later became part of Tromsø Municipality). It was established in the 1930s and was initially served by Norwegian Air Lines (DNL). During World War II it was taken over by the Luftwaffe and the aerodrome was expanded. A new seaplane route was established by DNL in 1946 with a daily service to Trondheim, using a Junkers Ju 52, which after a few months was extended northwards to Kirkenes.

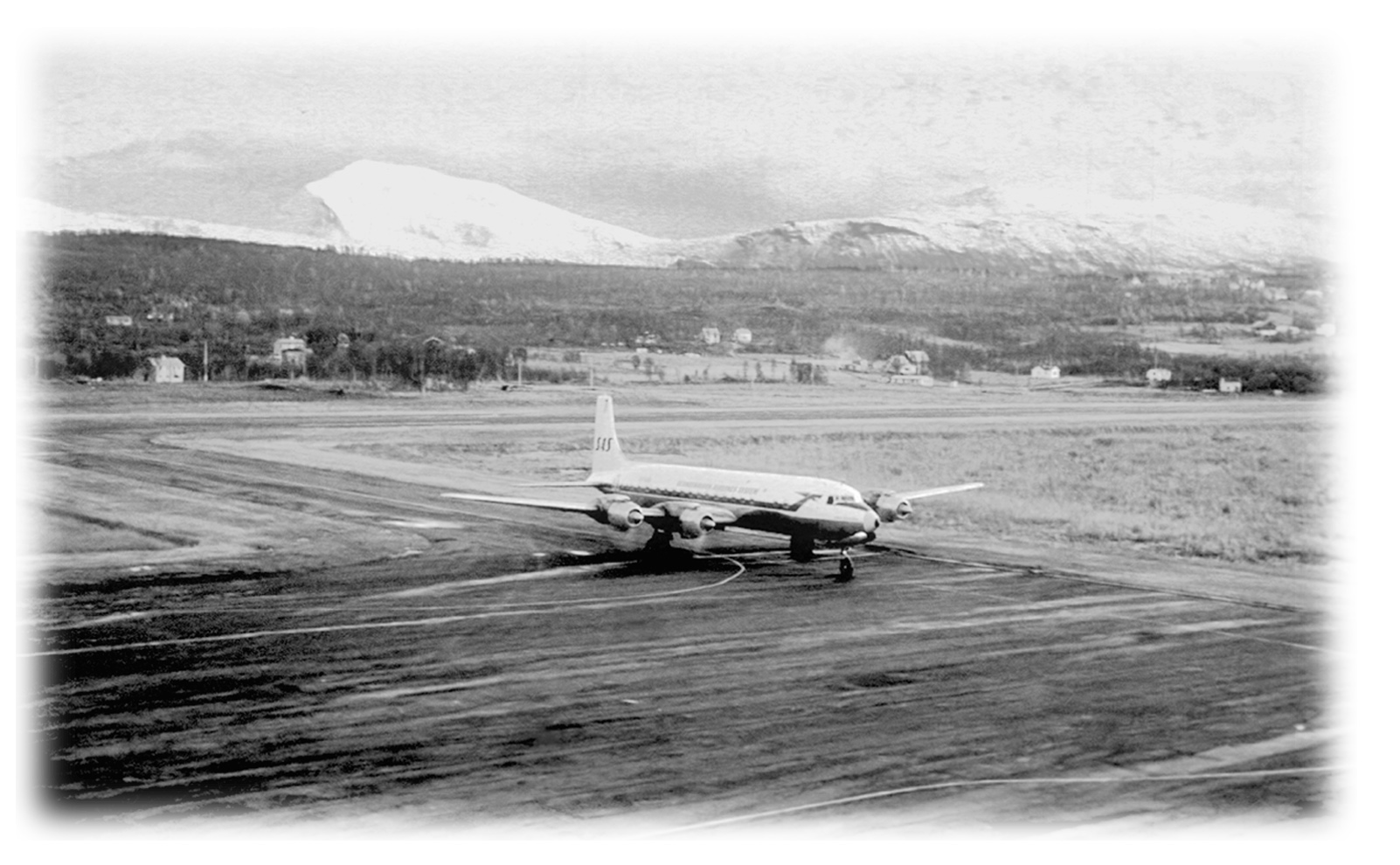
Scandinavian Airlines System Douglas DC-7 at Tromsø on 8 October 1965.

Operation of the water aerodrome was taken over from the Royal Norwegian Air Force by the municipalities of Tromsø and Tromsøysund. They built a new wharf and a terminal building and operated it as a joint venture on a per capita basis. From 1947 the larger and faster Short Sandringham flying boat was introduced on the route and a direct service to Oslo was introduced, allowing a travel time of eight hours. The Sandringhams would all be written off in accidents. With the opening of Bodø Airport in 1952 the Ju 52 was again put into service. This lasted until 1956, when Bardufoss Airport opened and passengers from Tromsø were transported there by bus (around 140 km (87 mi). In 1958 there were 6,825 Tromsø-bound passengers.

The Civil Airport Administration stated in 1950 that Tromsø, as Northern Norway's largest town, should have an airfield. Parliament's Standing Committee on Transport and Communications decided in 1953 that a new airport should be built at Langnes. Local politicians feared that Bardufoss would remain a permanent solution for Troms. A meeting in the chamber of commerce on 27 January 1955 resulted in a committee being established to lobby for an airfield. This was followed up with the municipality borrowing 350,000 Norwegian krone to expropriate the area. Initial plans for Langnes were for a 1,400-meter (4,600 ft) runway; this would not allow the largest aircraft to land. Local politicians therefore started lobbying national politicians for the runway length to be 1,600 meters (5,200 ft). After this had been passed, a new lobby campaign was established for a 2,000 meters (6,600 ft) runway, which was chosen.

Parliament approved the airport and the necessary funding in 1962 and construction started the following year with Selmer as the contractor. By then it was decided that the runway would measure 2,160 by 40 meters (7,090 by 130 ft), including overruns at each end. This allowed SAS to operate its new Sud Aviation Caravelles to Tromsø. The airport was officially opened on 14 September 1964.

=== Operational history ===
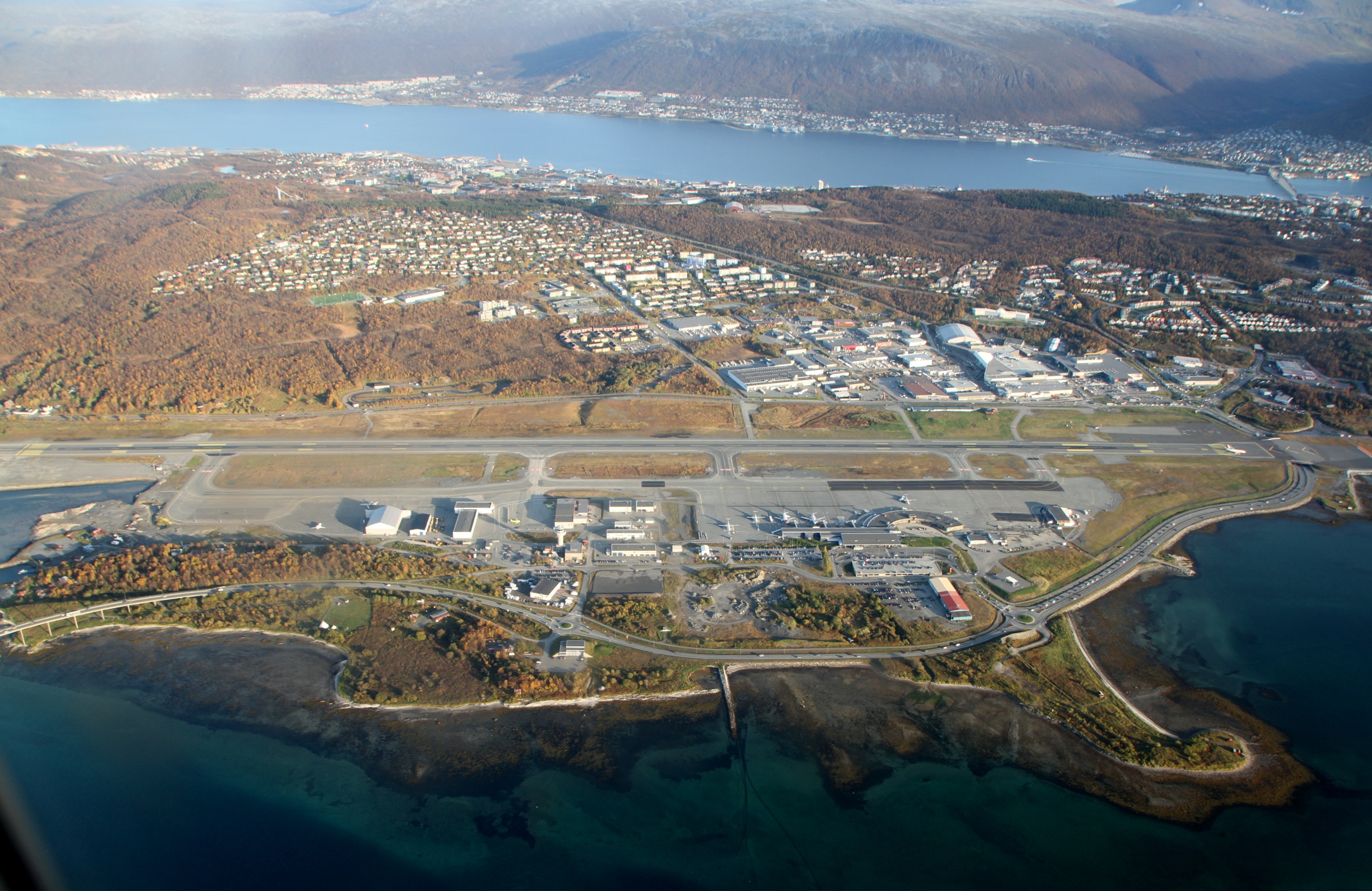
Overview of the airport

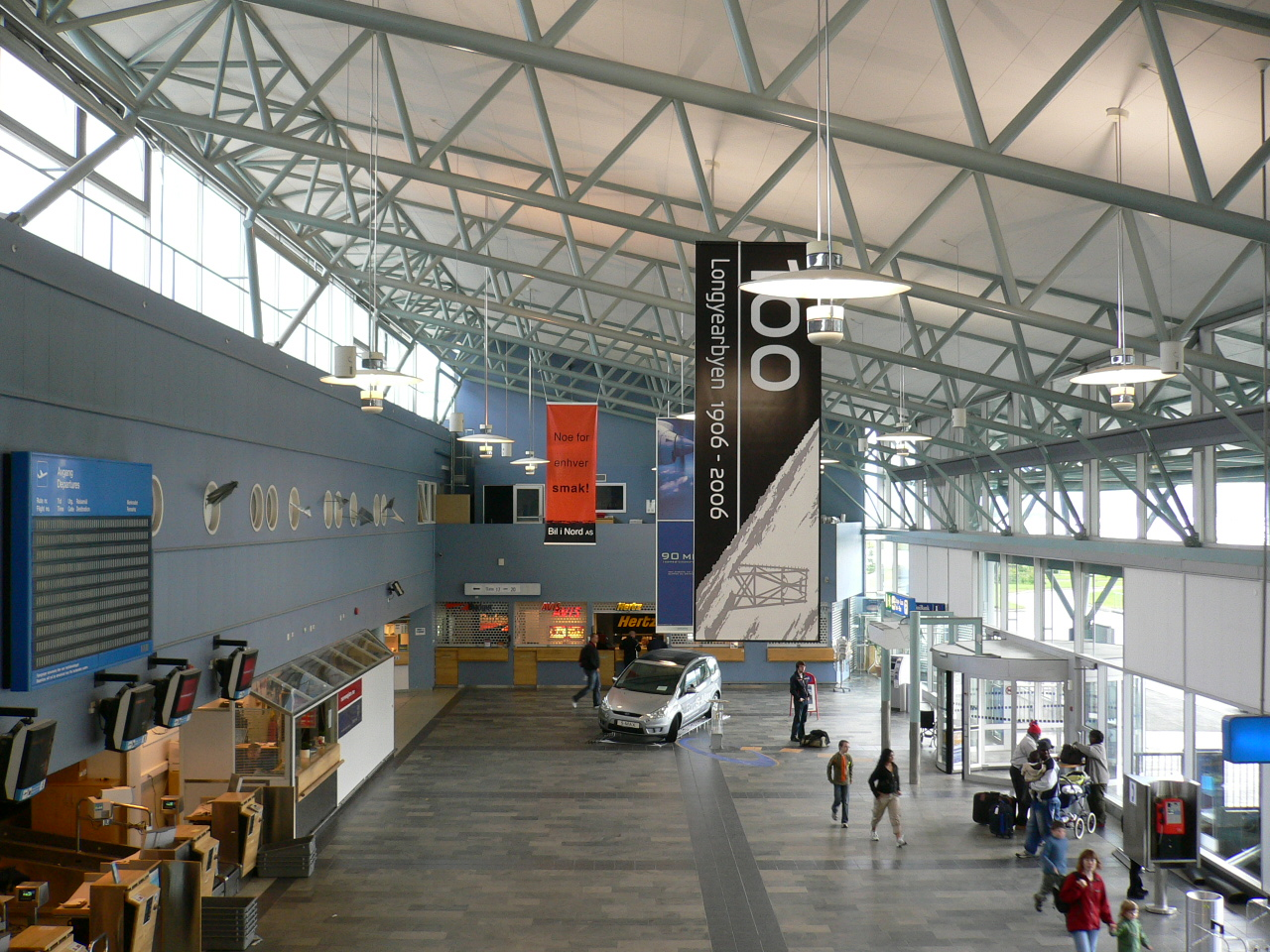
Check-in hall

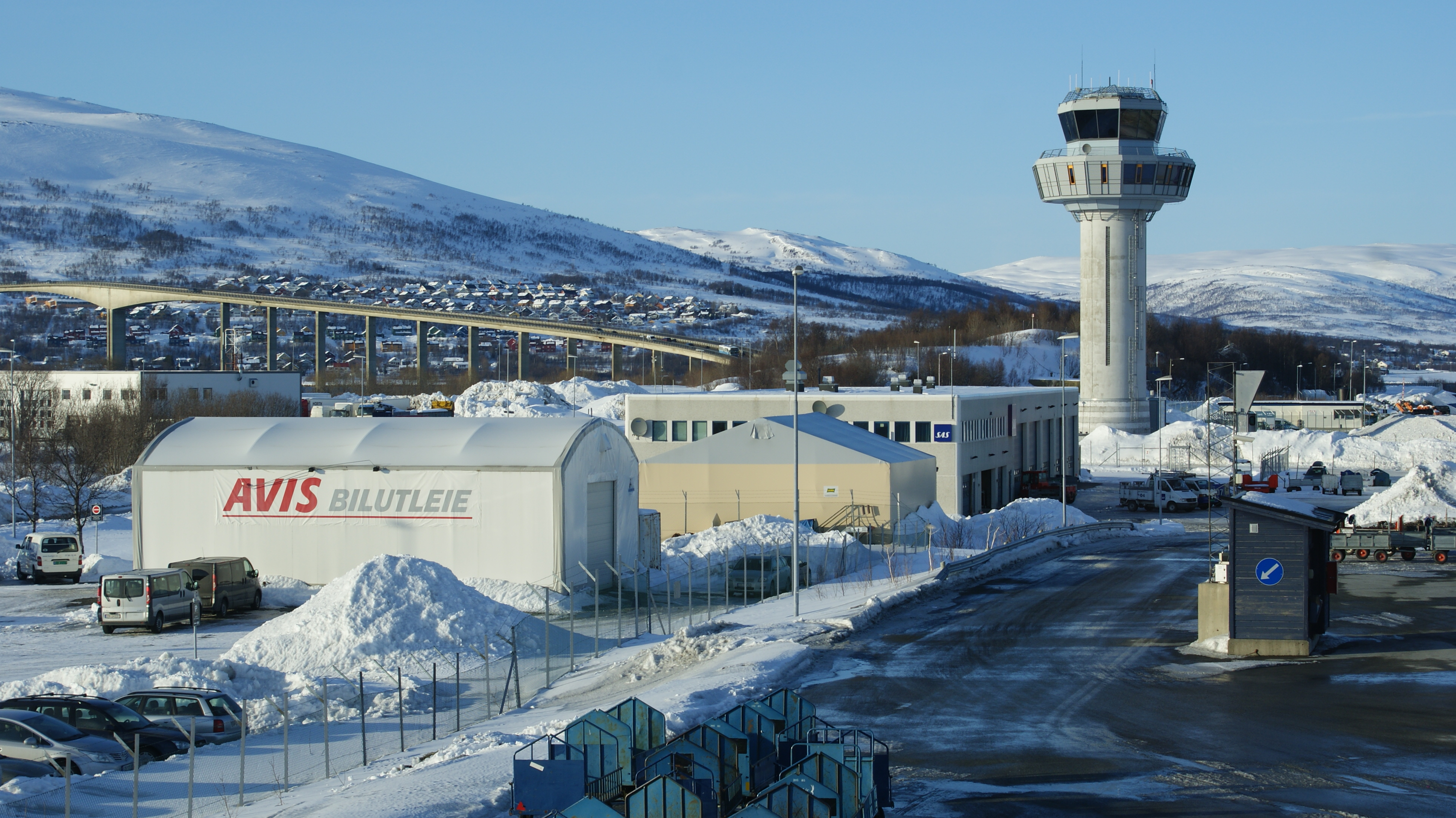
The control tower

Scandinavian Airlines System received concession to operate the route from Oslo to Tromsø. It was organized in such a way that SAS flew direct flights to Troms and then continued onwards to one or more of the three airports in Finnmark. SAS also flew services southwards to Bodø and Trondheim Airport, Værnes. Widerøe relocated its seaplanes in Tromsø to Langnes, stationed at a small water airport on the fjord, adjacent to the terminal building. Widerøe's flights to Finnmark were stopped, but it retained a service to Bardufoss. Widerøe retained this service until 1971, when it closed down its seaplane base in Tromsø.

The airport served 20,177 passengers in 1965. Braathens SAFE started flights to Tromsø on 1 April 1967. They were given permission to fly a services from Stavanger, Bergen and Ålesund to Bodø and Tromsø using a Fokker F27 Friendship. Once a week these aircraft continued onwards to Adventdalen's Longyearbyen Airport, as a corporate charter for Store Norske Spitsbergen Kulkompani. This lasted until 1975. That year Svalbard Airport, Longyear opened and the concession was granted to SAS, with Tromsø as an intermediate stop on the way to Oslo. Braathens' coastal route was later taken over by Busy Bee.

A network of regional airports opened in Finnmark on 1 August 1974. These were served with de Havilland Canada Twin Otter aircraft operated by Widerøe, with the western end of the service terminating in Tromsø. Also a service to Andøya Airport, Andenes was taken over by Widerøe in the early 1970s. By 1975 the airport handled 214,135 passengers. The increased traffic caused congestion in the terminal building, leading to the construction the a new terminal. Opened in 1977, it was nicknamed "the banana" due to its crescent shape. The terminal was renovated and expanded in 1985.

Norving established Tromsø's first international route in June 1979, to Kiruna Airport in Sweden using a Cessna 441 Conquest. Until 1982 it was flown with a SAS flight code. The airline established a second international route in May 1983 to Rovaniemi Airport in Finland. The following year Luleå Airport was added to the route. These routes lasted until 1986. Norving had a requiem on a route to Luleå and Oulu Airport starting 2 September 1991, although it only lasted until April 1992.

Petroleum prospecting in the Barents Sea commenced in 1980 and Tromsø was chosen as the helicopter base for this activity. Helikopter Service built a hangar and base at Langnes. They operated until 1984, when Lufttransport took over the operations and moved it to Andøya.

SAS Commuter was established in 1988. SAS then reorganized its routes, so that the Oslo flights terminated at Tromsø instead of continuing onwards to Finnmark. Meanwhile, more regional services in Finnmark were geared towards Alta Airport and the services from Tromsø to the primary airports in Finnmark were taken over by SAS Commuter using the Fokker 50. Patronage at the airport grew steadily until 1985, when it had 794,480 passengers. Then the pax remained steady until 1992. It then rose quickly for four years, hitting 1,413,610 in 1996. Since the ridership has remained steady.

Busy Bee went bankrupt in 1992 and Norwegian Air Shuttle took over Braathens SAFE's regional routes. Braathens SAFE and Aeroflot introduced flights to Murmansk Airport in Russia from 1993, and same year SAS started flights to London. The domestic aviation market was deregulated on 1 April 1994. This led Braathens to establish two direct flights per day to Oslo, for the first time competing with SAS on the same route out of Tromsø. Meanwhile, SAS Commuter started services to Bodø and Trondheim.

The "banana" terminal was becoming too small and the CAA initiated a major upgrade program to the airport. The runway was extended 240 meters (790 ft) in 1995 and the following year a new control tower opened. The new terminal building opened on 31 October 1997. It included three jetbridges and was to be used for jet services. The old terminal was used for regional and international services. An operations building was opened in 1999, completing the renovation.

SAS bought Braathens in 2002 and became SAS Braathens in 2004. Norwegian reorganized itself as a low-cost carrier. With its new launch on 1 September 2002, it opened a Tromsø to Oslo service with a Boeing 737-300. In December 2007 it launched a weekly service to London Stansted Airport. Nextjet started a triangular route between Tromsø, Luleå and Oulu on 12 January 2015.

== Facilities ==
Tromsø Airport is situated at Langnes on the western part of the island of Tromsøya in Tromsø, Norway. The airport has two terminals measuring a combined 13,500 square meters (145,000 sq ft). Terminal A, opened in 1997, features the check-in and has three jetbridges. The older Terminal B, from 1977, has the international hall. Jetliner operate out of Terminal A, while regional airlines operate out of both terminals. Combined there are stands for nine aircraft. The domestic departure hall features three stores, consisting of a kiosk, a bookstore and a cosmetic store. There is a duty-free shop in the international section, as well as a kiosk on the land side in the arrivals hall. The domestic departures hall has four dining establishments, including a pizzeria and a sports bar. There is a small café in the international departures hall. There is also an operations building measuring 6,400 square meters (69,000 sq ft).

The asphalt runway has physical dimensions 2,451 by 45 meters (8,041 by 148 ft) and is aligned 36/18, north–south. It has a takeoff run available (TORA) of 2,447 meters (8,028 ft) on runway 36 and 2,391 meters (7,844 ft) on runway 18, and a landing distance available (LDA) of 2,391 meters (7,844 ft) on 36 and 2,003 meters (6,572 ft) on 18. All have category I instrument landing system with precision approach path indicators. Due to high terrain in front of the airport, the ILSes on both runway directions are set up for a 4.0 degree glide slope, contrary to the standard 3.0 degrees. The airport is equipped with category 7 fire and rescue service. The airport has a reference elevation of 10 metres (33 ft) above mean sea level.

== Airlines and destinations ==
The main scheduled airlines operating at Tromsø are SAS, Norwegian and Widerøe. SAS operates services to Oslo and other airports in Norway, including Svalbard. Norwegian operates eight daily services from Tromsø, both to Oslo and other domestic cities, and also offer seasonal direct flights to London-Gatwick. Widerøe operates to various regional airports in northern Norway using a fleet of Bombardier Dash 8 aircraft. As of 2012 it had 23 daily services from Langnes. West Air Sweden operates cargo services for Norway Post. Lufttransport has its main base at Langnes. There are also charter services to Mediterranean destinations. Inbound charter flights are often flown from central parts of Europe to Tromsø with tourists.

The following airlines operate regular scheduled and charter flights at Tromsø Airport:

Airlines	Destinations
Aer Lingus	Seasonal: Dublin
Air France	Paris–Charles de Gaulle
Air Serbia	Seasonal: Belgrade (begins 14 December 2026)
Austrian Airlines	Seasonal: Vienna
British Airways	Seasonal: London–Heathrow
easyJet	Seasonal: Amsterdam, Berlin, Bristol, Edinburgh (begins 30 November 2026), London–Gatwick, Manchester, Milan–Malpensa, Paris–Charles de Gaulle
Edelweiss Air	Zürich
Eurowings	Seasonal: Berlin, Hamburg, Stuttgart
Finnair	Helsinki, Rovaniemi
Iberia	Seasonal: Madrid
Icelandair	Seasonal: Reykjavík–Keflavík
LOT Polish Airlines	Seasonal: Warsaw–Chopin (begins 1 December 2026)
Lufthansa	Frankfurt, Munich
Norwegian Air Shuttle	Alta, Oslo; Seasonal: Bergamo, Berlin, Copenhagen, Geneva, Glasgow (begins 11 December 2026), Helsinki (begins 18 November 2026), London–Gatwick, Manchester, Munich, Paris–Charles de Gaulle; Seasonal charter: Gran Canaria
Scandinavian Airlines	Alta, Bodø, Copenhagen, Longyearbyen, Oslo, Stockholm–Arlanda
Transavia	Seasonal: Amsterdam, Paris–Orly
Vueling	Seasonal: Barcelona
Widerøe	Alta, Andenes, Båtsfjord, Bergen, Berlevåg, Bodø, Hammerfest, Harstad/Narvik, Hasvik, Honningsvåg, Kirkenes, Lakselv, Leknes, Mehamn, Sørkjosen, Stokmarknes, Svolvær, Trondheim, Vadsø, Vardø
Wizz Air	Gdańsk; Seasonal: London–Luton, Milan–Malpensa (begins 15 December 2026)

== Statistics ==
Annual passenger traffic
Year	Passengers	% Change
2025	2,973,266	▲10.7%
2024	2,685,051	▲15.2%
2023	2,330,670	▲5.3%
2022	2,212,359	▲50.3%
2021	1,471,495	▲15.8%
2020	1,270,337	▼ -46.4%
2019	2,370,565	▲1.3%
2018	2,340,103	▲3.0%
2017	2,271,748	▲7.9%
2016	2,104,861	▲4.8%
2015	2,009,146	

== Ground transport ==
The airport is situated off County Road 862, ten minutes' drive and 5 kilometers (3 mi) from the city center. Bussring operates an airport coach service which runs to the city center and less frequently north to the University and the University Hospital. The city buses 24, 26, 40 and 42 stop at the airport. Taxis and car rental is available at Langnes. The airport has 900 payment parking slots.

== Bibliography ==
- Melling, Kjersti (2009). Nordavind fra alle kanter (in Norwegian). Oslo: Pilotforlaget.
- Olsen-Hagen, Bernt; Gulstad, Anne Blix; Gynnild, Olav (2012). Tromsø lufthavn, Langnes – Dokumentasjon for arkivmessig bevaring (PDF) (in Norwegian). Norwegian Aviation Museum. Archived (PDF) from the original on 19 January 2015.
- Svanberg, Erling (1990). Langs vei og lei i Nordland: samferdsel i Nordland gjennom 3000 år (in Norwegian). Nordland County Municipality. ISBN 82-7416-021-5.
- Tjelmeland, Halvard (1996). Tromsø gjennom 10000 år: Fra byfolk og bona til tromsøværing 1945–1996 (in Norwegian). Vol. 4. Tromsø: Tromsø Municipality. ISBN 82-993206-5-8.
- Tjomsland, Audun; Wilsberg, Kjell (1995). Braathens SAFE 50 år: Mot alle odds. Oslo. ISBN 82-990400-1-9.
- Ytreberg, N. A. (1971). Tromsø bys historie (in Norwegian). Vol. 3. Tromsø: Reidar Hov.
