= Svalbard Airport =

Main airport serving Svalbard, Norway

Svalbard Airport Svalbard lufthavn

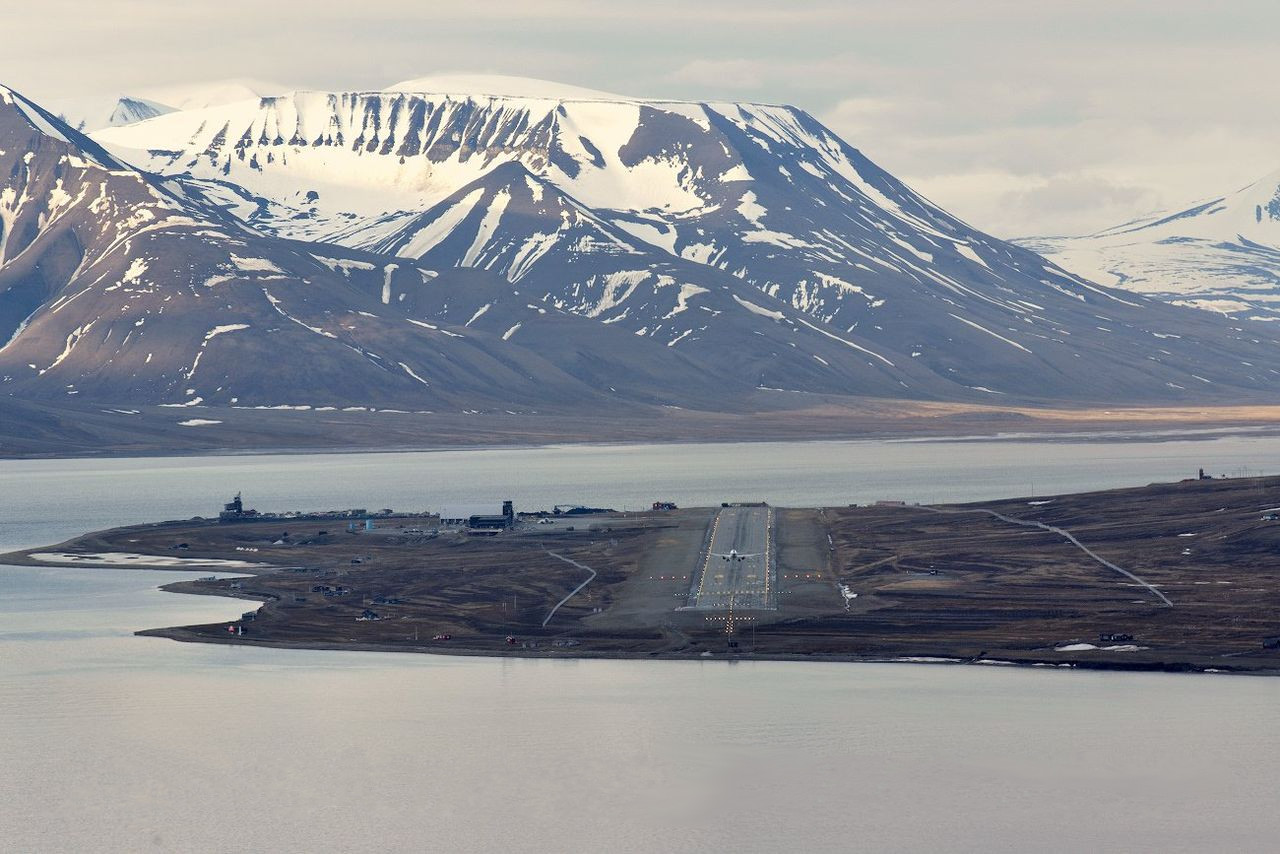
- IATA: LYR; ICAO: ENSB

Summary
- Airport type: Public
- Owner/Operator: Avinor
- Serves: Longyearbyen, Svalbard, Norway
- Location: Hotellneset, Longyearbyen, Svalbard, Norway
- Elevation AMSL: 28 m (92 ft)
- Coordinates: 78°14′46″N 015°27′56″E
- Website: avinor.no

Map
- Location within Svalbard Location within Arctic

Runways
Direction	Length		Surface
Direction	m	ft	Surface
09/27	2,484	8,146	Asphalt

Statistics (2014)
- Passengers: 154,261
- Air movements: 6,944
- Cargo (tonnes): 608
- Source: Norwegian AIP at Avinor; Statistics from Avinor

Svalbard Airport (Norwegian: Svalbard lufthavn; IATA: LYR, ICAO: ENSB) is the main airport serving Svalbard in Norway. It is 5 km (3.1 mi) northwest of Longyearbyen on the west coast, and is the northernmost airport in the world with scheduled public flights. The first airport near Longyearbyen was constructed during World War II. In 1959, it was first used for occasional flights, but could only be used a few months a year. Construction of the new airport at Hotellneset started in 1973, and the airport was opened on 2 September 1975. It is owned and operated by state-owned Avinor.

In 2014, the airport handled 154,261 passengers. Scandinavian Airlines operates daily flights to Tromsø and Oslo in mainland Norway. Lufttransport provides services to the other airport on Svalbard: Ny-Ålesund, using Dornier 228 turboprop aircraft. There are also regular charter flights.

== History ==
=== Adventdalen ===
The first airstrip on Svalbard was constructed in Adventdalen, near Longyearbyen, by the Luftwaffe during World War II. It was not used immediately after the war; during the summer the archipelago was served by ships but was completely isolated from November to May. In the early 1950s, the Norwegian Air Force started postal flights using a Catalina aircraft that departed from Tromsø and dropped postal parcels at Bear Island and at Longyearbyen. However, these aircraft never landed until 9 February 1959, when a resident had become seriously ill and needed to be flown to mainland Norway for treatment. The mining company Store Norske Spitsbergen Kulkompani cleared the runway at Adventsdalen and the 14-hour flight and landing were successful. A second landing, this time for delivery of post, was made on 11 March.

While the Catalina was suitable for postal flights, it was not suitable as a permanent solution for transporting passengers and freight, mainly due to its small size. Store Norske contacted the domestic airline Braathens SAFE for a regular service. A Douglas DC-4 flew the first trial flight on 2 April 1959, with 54 passengers from Bardufoss Airport. Store Norske had cleared a 1,800 by 40 metres (5,910 by 130 ft) runway for the aircraft. The next flight occurred in 1962, followed by another in 1963 and two in 1964.

The absence of runway lights meant that flights were only permitted during daylight. This hindered flights during parts of December and January when the sun never rises. By April, the runway ice would begin melting as the sun would appear allowing flights during the summer. Navigation was conducted using radio signals from Bear Island and Isfjord.

The first night landing was made on 8 December 1965. A DC-4 took off from the new Tromsø Airport and delivered the mail at Bear Island before continuing to Longyearbyen. The runway was lit up using paraffin lamps and lights from cars parked along the runway. A radio transmitter was also installed at Hotellneset. During the 1965–66 season, Braathens SAFE made 16 flights to Svalbard. The following two seasons, a contract was awarded to Scandinavian Airlines System (SAS), but after that, the contract reverted to Braathens SAFE. Fred. Olsen Airtransport made its first flight to Svalbard in 1966. By 1969, a total of 50 flights had been made to Svalbard, and by 1972, the 100th was made. By then, Braathens SAFE had started using Douglas DC-6B aircraft. During these years, Store Norske also installed permanent lights. The first jet plane to land in Adventdalen was a Fred Olsen Flyselskap Dassault Falcon 20, LN-FOI. The landing was in 1971, and the aircraft brought in 1700 lbs of mail and passengers, picking up a geological survey party. A Fokker F-28 landed on 29 April 1972. From 1974, Boeing 737-200C aircraft were taken into use. They had a side cargo door, allowing easy loading of cargo into the main cabin. Braathens SAFE built a small depot with spare parts and up to 90,000 litres (20,000 imp gal; 24,000 US gal) of fuel. Aeroflot started flights to Adventdalen in 1973 to serve the neighboring Russian community of Barentsburg.

=== Hotellneset ===
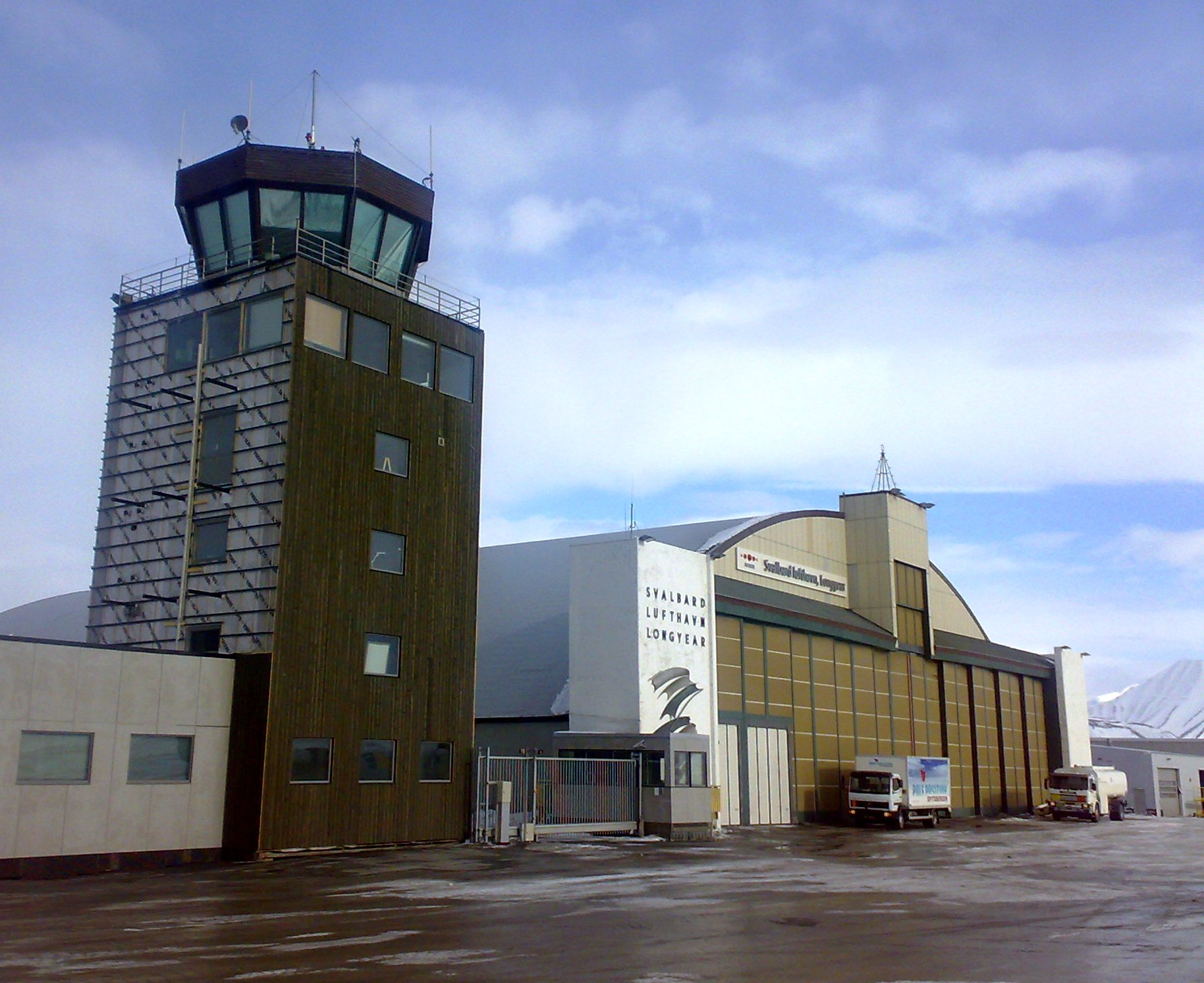
The tower and hangar

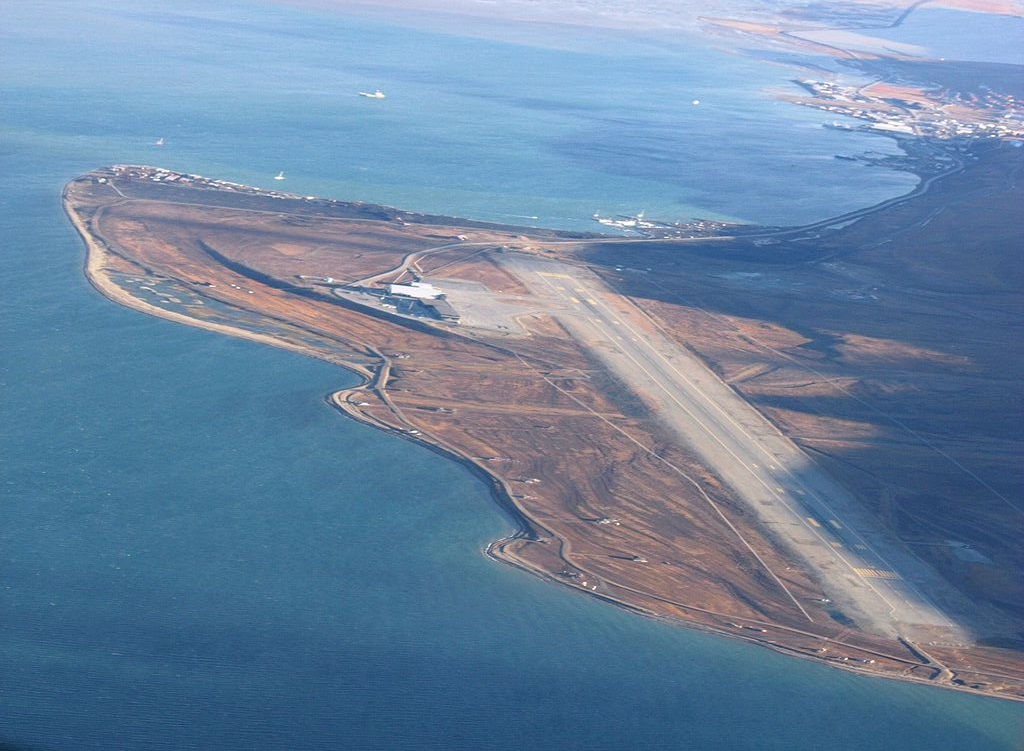
Aerial view of the airport

The Svalbard Treaty specifies that no military installations are permitted on the archipelago. The Soviet authorities were concerned that a permanent civilian airport could also be used by Norwegian and NATO forces. But the Soviets also needed an airport to serve their settlements at Barentsburg and Pyramiden, and by the early 1970s, an understanding was reached between the two countries.

Construction started in 1973. The airport needed to be built on permafrost. The runway is insulated against the ground, so it will not melt during the summer. The hangar is frozen into the ground, with the pillars being melted into place and then being frozen stuck. The runway was plagued with frost heaves due to an incorrect construction method, forcing the airport to regularly re-asphalt the runway. In 1989, parts of the runway were re-insulated, repairing those areas that previously had been the worst of an acceptable solution. In 2006, this solution was administered to the remaining parts of the runway. An upgrade to the terminal building to allow larger capacity was completed in 2007. The runway was renumbered from 10/28 to 09/27 on 07 September 2023.

=== Services ===
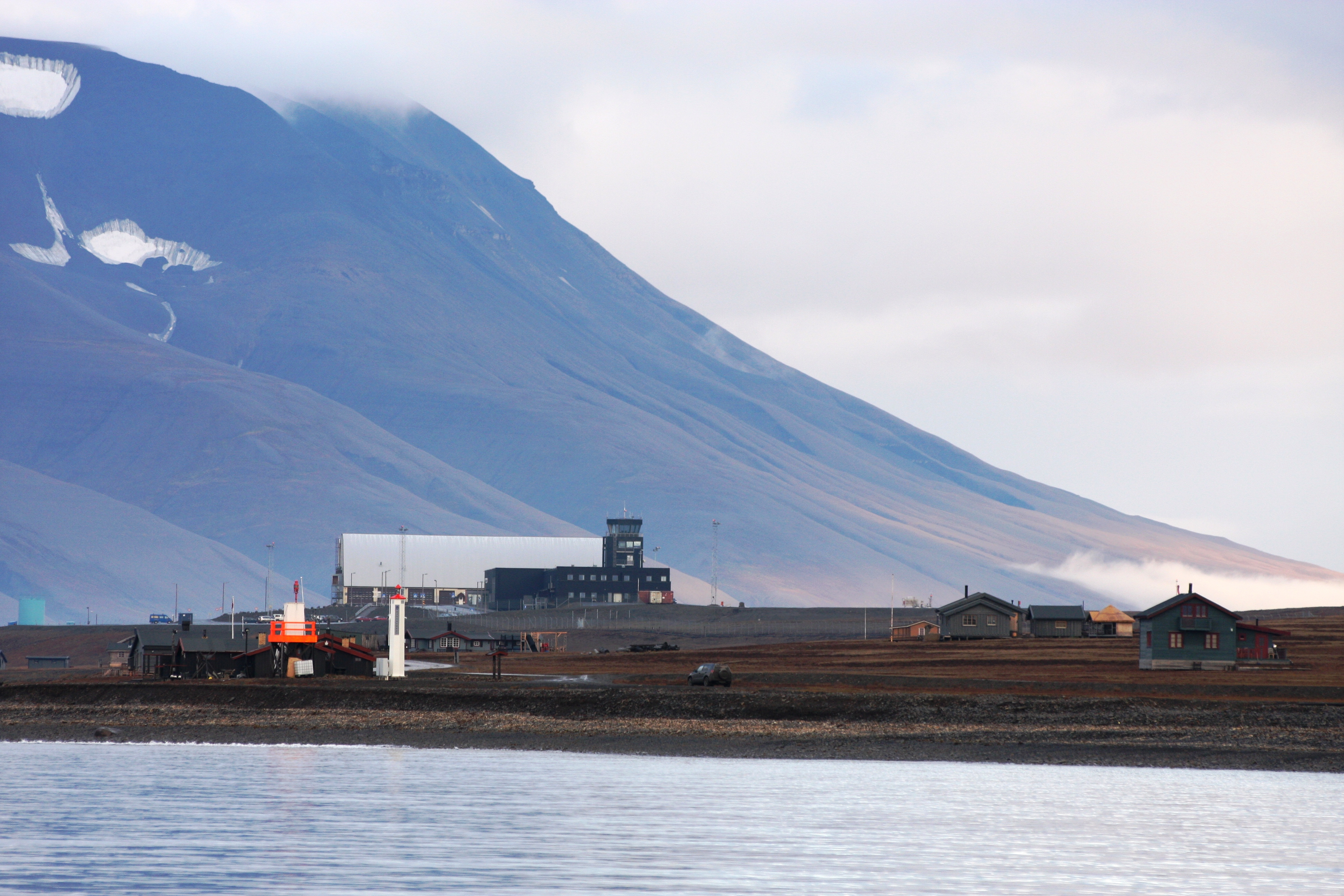
The airport as seen from the fjord

Both Braathens SAFE and SAS applied for the concession to fly from the mainland to Norway. This was granted to SAS, who would have one weekly service. Braathens SAFE continued to fly charter flights for the Norwegian coal mining company, Store Norske. In this way, the airport was useful until the official opening. The first landing at the new airport was made on 14 September 1974 with a Fokker F-28, and Braathens SAFE continued to fly until 1 September 1975. Russian authorities granted a concession for a semi-weekly service by Aeroflot from Murmansk Airport. The first attempt to officially open the airport was made with an SAS Douglas DC-9 on 14 August 1975. Among the guests on board was King Olav V, but thick fog at Longyearbyen forced the airplane to return. On 1 September, a Fokker F-27 from Braathens SAFE was used to calibrate the runways; on board were pilots from SAS and Aeroflot to learn about the landing conditions. The following day, the second attempt to open the airport was successful. In addition to the scheduled services, Store Norske chartered cargo flights from Fred Olsen Air Transport.

Lufttransport has been at the airport since 1976. In 1984, two Bell 212 helicopters were stationed at the airport on contract with the Governor of Svalbard. The company signed an agreement with the Norwegian Coast Guard to have a Partenavia Spartacus plane stationed at Longyearbyen for fishery surveillance. Since 1994, the company has had a Dornier 228 stationed at the airport, and two since 2001.

On 14 August 1987, Braathens SAFE re-entered the market, flying in parallel with SAS to Tromsø and Oslo. For the first time, the scheduled flights to Oslo were offered as day flights instead of the night flights offered by SAS. In 2002, after SAS bought Braathens, the subsidiary took over all flights to Longyearbyen for the group. From May 2004, they merged to SAS Braathens, that again became SAS from 1 June 2007. From 1 April to 1 November 2004, Norwegian Air Shuttle introduced three weekly services from Longyearbyen to Tromsø and Oslo, using Boeing 737-300 aircraft, but the service was terminated due to low loads. A new service was started on 27 March 2008, with two direct services to Oslo, using larger Boeing 737-800 aircraft. but again the route was terminated later the same year. As of 2014, Norwegian is again flying to Svalbard from Oslo. Finnair announced plans to begin flights from Helsinki in summer 2016, but Norwegian authorities did not allow this route as it was not in bilateral agreement on air traffic between Finland and Norway.

Norway has decided that from October 2017, Svalbard Airport shall not have international status, meaning that aircraft from other countries than Norway are not permitted anymore. As an exception, Russian aircraft are still allowed due to a treaty with Russia. The reason is that the airport is not in line with guidelines for international airports, because this is considered too costly for Norway.

The entire Svea community is being dismantled and the area returned to nature, and so, the routes to Svea ceased in 2022.

== Facilities ==
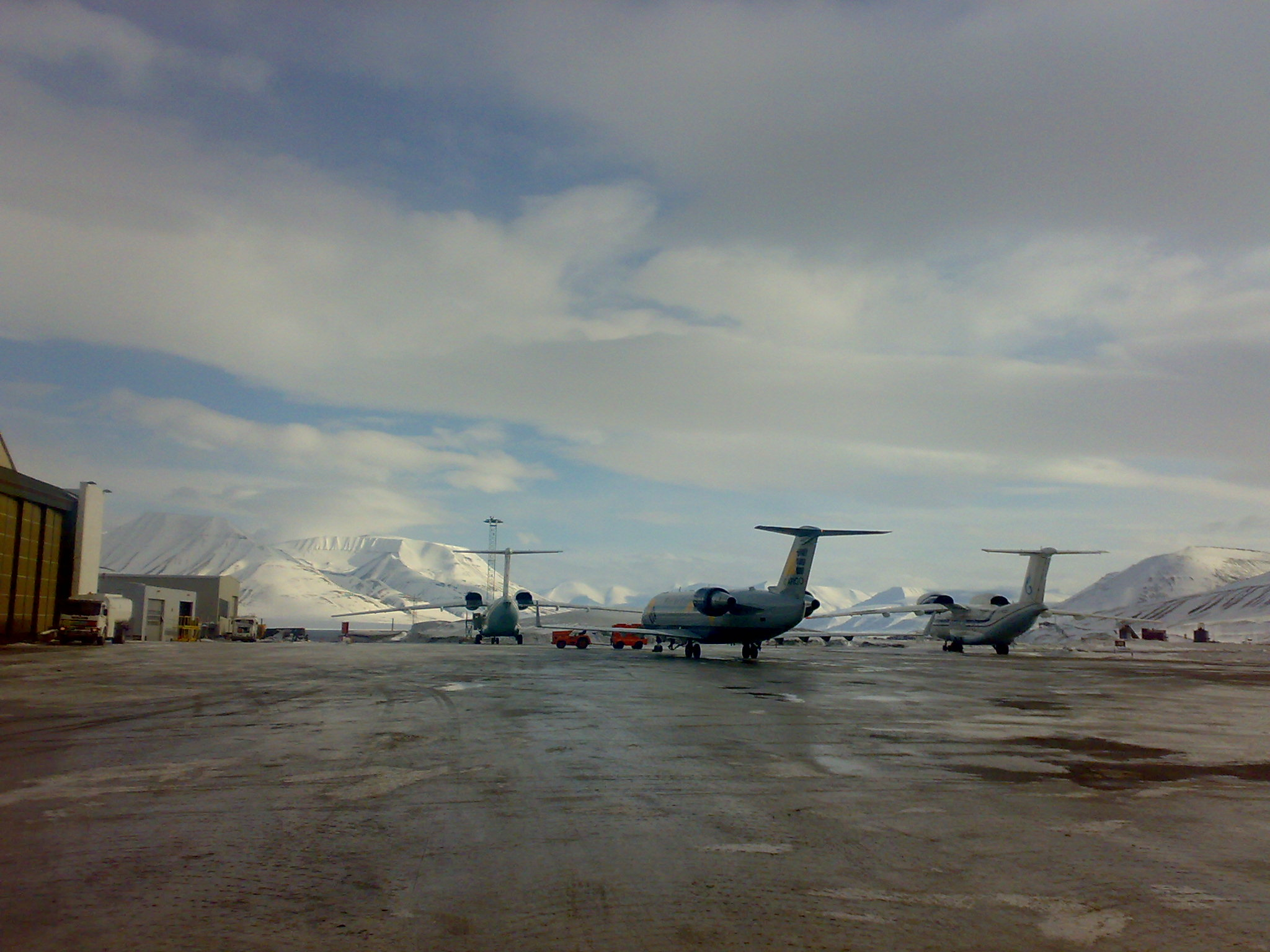
Aircraft parked at the airport

The airport is located 5 km (3.1 mi) northwest of Longyearbyen, the largest settlement on Svalbard. The airport also serves the nearby Russian settlement of Barentsburg. Mainland Norway is part of the Schengen Area, but Svalbard is excluded. At the airport, no passport control is carried out, although exit checks are performed in Oslo or Tromsø.

There are 200 free outdoor parking spaces at the airport. Taxis, rental cars and airport coaches are also available (a shuttle bus operates to hotels and guesthouses in Longyearbyen and Nybyen). Scandinavian Airlines provides handling services through SAS Ground Services.

The runway is 2,483 metres (8,146 ft) long and aligned 09/27 (roughly east–west), equipped with an instrument landing system, but there are no taxiways. The 45 metres (148 ft) wide runway has two culverts that allow water from the mountain Platåberget to drain under it. About one-third of the runway is dug into the terrain, while about two-thirds is built on an embankment. A layer of frost-stable fill, varying from 1 to 4 metres (3 ft 3 in to 13 ft 1 in) is under the runway to hinder the soil from unfreezing during summer.

In 2026, the airport inaugurated a biogas plant to reduce its emissions.

== Airlines and destinations ==
The following airlines operate regular scheduled and charter flights at Svalbard:

Airlines	Destinations
Arktikugol	Charter: Murmansk
Lufttransport	Charter: Ny-Ålesund, Sveagruva
Norwegian Air Shuttle	Oslo, Tromsø
Scandinavian Airlines	Oslo, Tromsø

=== Other tenants ===
Lufttransport has a base at Svalbard Airport with two 19-seat Dornier 228-202K aircraft and 15 employees. The airline flies several weekly trips to Ny-Ålesund Airport, Hamnerabben on behalf of Kings Bay with research personnel. In 2009, Lufttransport's routes to Ny-Ålesund airport and the former Svea airport involved transport of 21,000 passengers and 500 tonnes of cargo per year. On behalf of the Norwegian Coast Guard, Lufttransport flies about 400 hours annual of aerial surveillance. The Barentsburg mine has a Mi-8 helicopter used for travel to and from the Longyearbyen airport and more. The Svalbard Global Seed Vault is located a few miles south of the airport.

== Statistics ==
Annual passenger traffic
Year	Passengers	% Change
2025	200,401	▲8.4%
2024	184,856	▲10.3%
2023	167,533	▼ −1.6%
2022	170,277	▲106.9%
2021	82,297	▲20.5%
2020	68,271	▼ −63.2%
2019	185,449	▲2.2%
2018	181,469	▲7.2%
2017	169,278	▼ −0.4%
2016	170,014	▲2.1%
2015	166,477	

== Accidents and incidents ==
- On 10 October 1986, a Cessna 185 from Antarctax crashed immediately after leaving Svalbard Airport en route to Ny-Ålesund, killing all six on board.
- On 29 August 1996, Vnukovo Airlines Flight 2801 from Vnukovo Airport, Moscow, crashed into a mountain about 14 kilometres (8.7 mi) from the airport. All 141 people on board the Tupolev Tu-154M died. It is the worst air crash in Norwegian history.

== Sources ==
- Tjomsland, Audun & Wilsberg, Kjell (1996). Braathens SAFE 50 år: Mot alle odds. Oslo. ISBN 82-990400-1-9.
