= Kirkenes Airport =

Airport in Sør-Varanger, Norway

Kirkenes Airport Kirkenes lufthavn

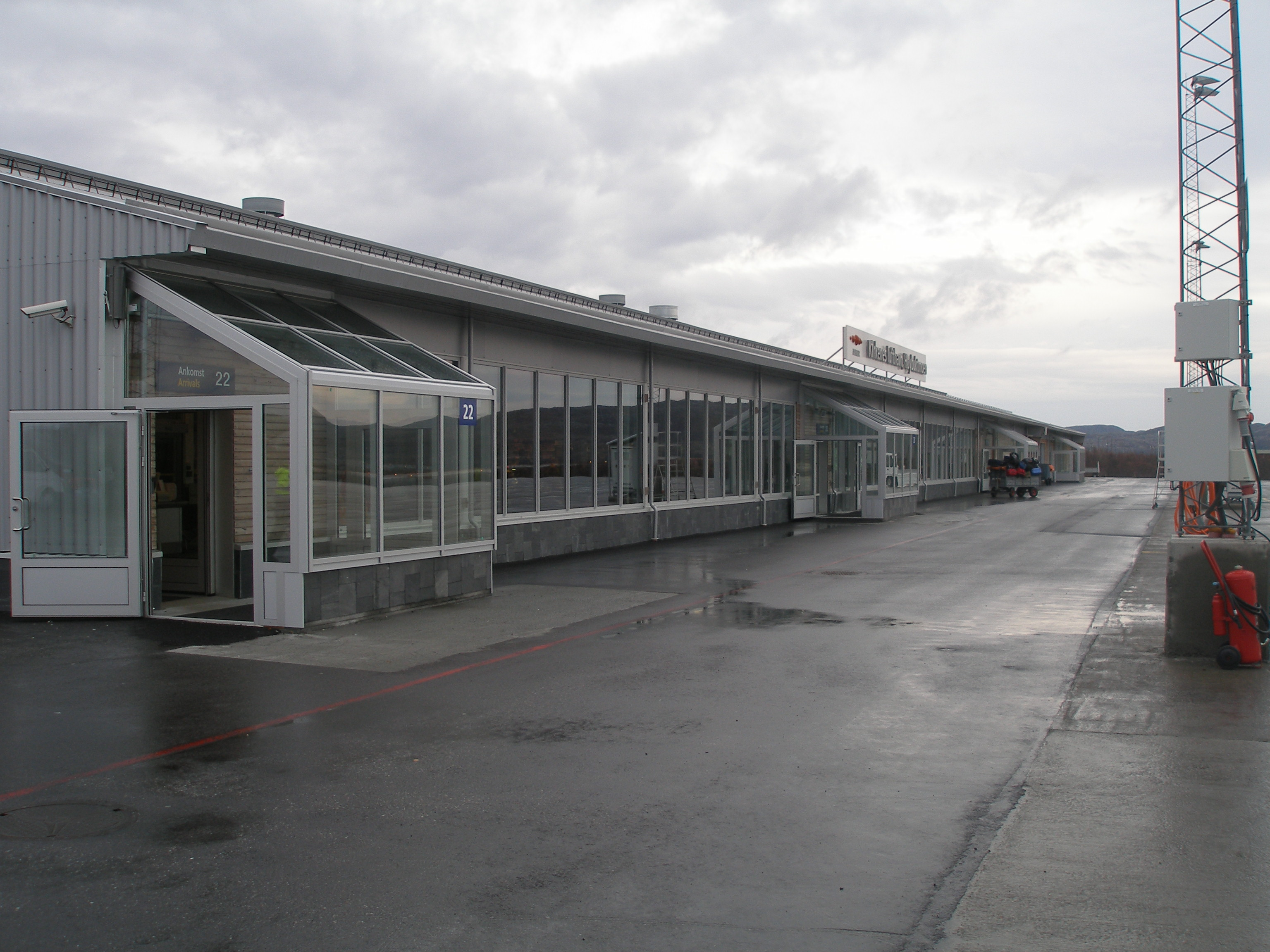
- IATA: KKN; ICAO: ENKR

Summary
- Airport type: Public
- Operator: Avinor
- Serves: Kirkenes, Norway
- Location: Høybuktmoen, Sør-Varanger, Finnmark
- Elevation AMSL: 282 ft / 86 m
- Coordinates: 69°43′30″N 029°53′16″E
- Website: avinor.no

Map
- Location of the airport Location of Finnmark in Norway KKN (Norway)

Runways
Direction	Length		Surface
Direction	m	ft	Surface
05/23	2,355	7,726	Asphalt

Statistics (2013)
- Passengers: 297,149
- Aircraft movements: 8,643
- Cargo (tonnes): 367
- Source: AIP and Statistics from Avinor

Kirkenes Airport (Norwegian: Kirkenes lufthavn; IATA: KKN, ICAO: ENKR) is an international airport located at Høybuktmoen, 15 kilometers (9 mi) west of the town of Kirkenes, in Sør-Varanger Municipality in Finnmark county, Norway. Operated by the state-owned Avinor, the airport has a single 2,115-by-45-meter (6,939 by 148 ft) asphalt runway numbered 05-23. Scandinavian Airlines and Norwegian Air Shuttle operate Boeing 737-services to Oslo Airport, Gardermoen, in part generated by Høybuktmoen's function as a hub for Widerøe's regional services to other airports in eastern Finnmark. There are also summer charter flights to Central Europe to bring tourists to the Hurtigruten cruises. The airport had 297,149 passengers in 2013.

Høybuktmoen was built as a military air station by the Luftwaffe during World War II. Civilian services were introduced after the war, but abandoned in 1948. The airport reopened in 1963 with a new terminal and an extended runway. Originally the airport was served by Scandinavian Airlines System and Finnair, and from the 1970s also Widerøe and Norving. Since 1990, five airlines have attempted to provide services to Murmansk, Russia. Originally the airport had two runways, 1,600 and 1,200 meters (5,200 and 3,900 ft) long, respectively, but the smaller was closed in 1996 when the longer was extended. A new terminal building was put into use in 2006. Because of the terrain the runway's length cannot be exploited under some wind conditions, so there is a proposal to level some of the land.

== History ==
=== Construction ===
The first aircraft to land in Sør-Varanger was part of a trial undertaken in 1922 by the Royal Norwegian Navy Air Service to test the flight time from Horten to Kirkenes. The mission was awarded to Hjalmar Riiser-Larsen and Finn Lützow-Holm, who chose to fly the 45-hour trip along the coast. The next landing was a military Fokker which landed on the iced lake of Andrevann in 1934. Widerøe undertook several flights within the municipality in 1937, offering sightseeing and undertaking aerial photography. The first scheduled service started to Kirkenes the following summer with postal flights to Tromsø flown by Widerøe on behalf of Norwegian Air Lines (DNL). The flight allowed post to be sent from Oslo to Kirkenes in one day and was continued the next season. The route was flown from Tromsø with intermediate stops at Vadsø and Hammerfest. There were public demands for passenger services be started.

Instead, in 1940 the German occupation of Norway terminated all civilian aviation until 1945. A limited service was kept in Northern Norway during the resistance, but these were terminated after the German forces took control of the whole country. From 26 September 1940, three weekly services were operated from Trondheim to Tromsø, with two of these continuing to Kirkenes, using a 16-passenger Junkers Ju 52. This was terminated on 20 March 1941, after most of the airline's pilots had fled to the United Kingdom to support the Allied forces.

Høybuktmoen was selected by the Luftwaffe as one of three air stations in Northern Norway, along with Bardufoss Airport and Lakselv Airport, Banak. They built two runways, 1,000 and 1,200 meters (3,300 and 3,900 ft) long, respectively. Høybuktmoen was primarily used for attacks against the Arctic convoys. With the German withdrawal in Operation Nordlicht in October 1944, the runways were blasted at several points. The damage proved easy to repair and by January 1945, both troops of Norwegian police officers from Sweden led by Bernt Balchen and the Soviet Air Forces could land at Høybuktmoen.

=== Reopening ===
The first service after the war was started by DNL on 13 October 1945 and flew to Tromsø, with onwards connection to Trondheim and Oslo. The service only lasted until 1948, when it was replaced with a Ju 52 seaplane route with intermediate stops at Vadsø and Hammerfest to Tromsø. The route flew one direction each day, was only operated during the summer and was plagued with poor regularity. The original water aerodrome was located at Soldatbukta at Prestøya. Later it was moved to the quay on the north side of Langfjorden, on the other side as Kirkenes. Passengers were therefore freighted across the fjord by boat to the aircraft. The air traffic control moved from Høybuktmoen to Haganes in 1949, but returned in 1963.

The route had doubled its patronage since its introduction by 1953—the last year it was operated by DNL. From 1954 the route was taken over by Widerøe, who introduced smaller Noorduyn Norseman and de Havilland Canada DHC-3 Otter aircraft. The Widerøe seaplane service was flown on behalf of DNL and later Scandinavian Airlines System (SAS) and remained until 1963. Varangfly—based in Kirkenes—was established in 1959 by general aviation enthusiasts from Kirkenes Flyklubb. The airline originally had two seaplanes, a two-seat Piper J-3 Cub and a five-seat Norsk Flyindustri C-5 Polar. Operations started on 17 June 1960. The company gradually developed services within scheduled, charter and air ambulance services. Varangfly later also bought an eight-seat aircraft which offered flights to Lakselv and Bardufoss, and to Ivalo Airport in Finland, where it connected to Finnair's service to Helsinki.

Planning for a new airport at Høybunktmoen was initiated by a committee established by the Ministry of Transport and Communications in 1947, and resulted in the National Plan of 1952. Although Kirkenes was included in the plan construction was placed on hold, both because of high costs and because other airports further south had to be completed before or at the same time. Construction at Høybuktmoen started in 1961 and the airport opened on 4 May 1963. Work consisted of expanding the east–west runway to 1,600 meters (5,200 ft) and building a new passenger terminal and control tower; the latter two were not completed in time for the opening. Alta Airport and Lakselv Airport, Banak opened the same year, and Tromsø Airport followed suit the following year.

=== Operational history ===
SAS introduced the 52-passenger Convair Metropolitan on their domestic services, while Finnair served the airport with the 30-seat Douglas DC-3 on their flights to Finland. In the first month the two airlines had 88 aircraft movements, while the Royal Norwegian Air Force had 44 and Varangfly 60. Both SAS and Finnair replaced Varangfly's routes, which did not operate scheduled flights from the new airport. Varangfly therefore sold its land aircraft and instead became a seaplane operator. SAS introduced the 122-passenger Douglas DC-9 jet aircraft at Kirkenes from 1969. Helikopter Service flew a civilian helicopter to Høybuktmoen for the first time the same year. Kirkenes Airport served 20,638 passengers in 1964 and 40,477 in 1970.

Busy Bee was contracted by the Norwegian Armed Forces to fly military charters in June 1968. They had two 50-passenger Fokker F27 Friendships stationed at Høybuktmoen and flew two daily services from Kirkenes and other locations in Northern Norway to Bodø, with onwards connection to Stavanger and Oslo on Fridays. This arrangement continued until Busy Bee's bankruptcy in 1992.

Varangfly merged with two other airlines in 1970 to create the Kirkenes-based Norving. The new airline bought an eight-passenger Britten Norman Islander and started round trips between Kirkenes and the newly upgraded Berlevåg Airport and Mehamn Airport. This was later followed up with routes to Hasvik Airport and Kjøllefjord Airport, and in 1975 to Båtsfjord Airport and Vadsø Airport. On the other hand, Widerøe received the concessions to operate to Hammerfest Airport, which opened on 1 August 1973, and Honningsvåg Airport, which opened in 1977. To serve the regional services Widerøe originally operated twenty-passenger de Havilland Canada aircraft.

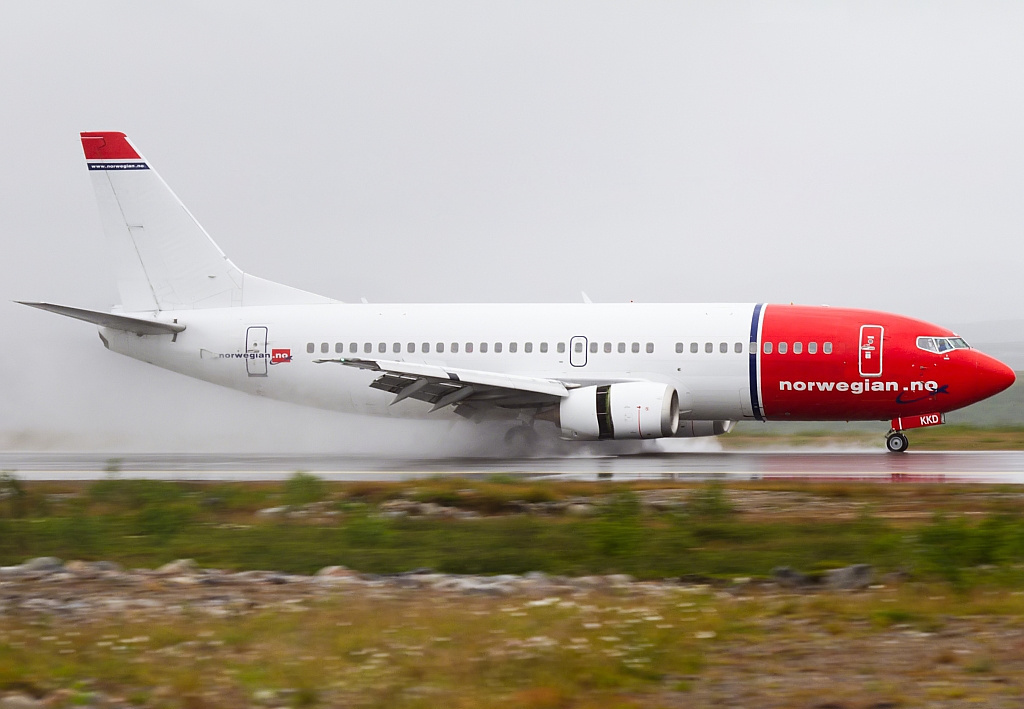
Norwegian Air Shuttle Boeing 737-300 landing on Runway 06 during heavy rain and wind

Finnair terminated their services to Kirkenes in 1975. At the same time the ministry and SAS started looking at the airport structure in Finnmark, as all the services in the county were in need of subsidies. The proposals were either for a hike in the ticket prices or a reduction of Kirkenes to a regional-only airport. SAS was flying a 90-seat aircraft two to three times per day between Kirkenes and Alta with only ten to fifteen passengers. The airport structure was kept, but ticket prices continued to rise. The airport served 110,000 passengers in 1983. Norving continued Varangfly's air ambulance contract until 1987, when the service was taken over by Air Express. Later the contract was awarded to Lufttransport, who operated the Beechcraft Super King Air. Norving filed for bankruptcy in 1992 and their routes were taken over by Widerøe.

SAS Commuter was established in 1988 and started operations in Northern Norway in May 1990. This involved a change to the operations so that all DC-9 services from Kirkenes to Oslo were terminated and instead Fokker 50 services were introduced to Alta and Tromsø. SAS was able to reduce costs by no longer operating local routes with the DC-9 and instead increased the number of flights. The new system was met with massive opposition in Kirkenes. Emergency meetings were being held between SAS Commuter and the ministry by June 1990 because of low regularity and many cancellations. Non-transfer flights from Kirkenes to Oslo were reintroduced on 1 April 1992, albeit with the services stopping at Tromsø.

Service between Kirkenes and Murmansk Airport were initiated by SAS Commuter in 1990, but the airline quickly terminated the service. Aeroflot started two weekly services between Kirkenes and Murmansk and onwards to Arkhangelsk Airport in June 1990. The service was summer-only until 1992, when they increased to an all-year service. Norving also started a service from Kirkenes to Murmansk, but their service terminated with the airline failing. Widerøe started two weekly services between Kirkenes and Murmansk in 1994, using Twin Otter aircraft. Aeroflot terminated their service in 1998 and Widerøe followed suit in 2000.

The runway was extended eastwards by 290 meters (950 ft) in the late 1990s. The first expansion took place in 1996 and the second in 2000. The extensions never received operating permit from the Civil Aviation Authority of Norway as there are two hills which hinder aircraft landing from the east to follow a safe final approach.

Arctic Air took over Widerøe's flights to Vardø in 2000, using a 19-passenger Dornier 228. They also flew a service to Murmansk in 2001 and 2002. They lost the Vardø–Kirkenes contract back to Widerøe in 2003. SAS bought Braathens in 2002, resulting in the latter taking over the service and increasing to two daily flights to Oslo. SAS and Braathens merged in 2004 to form SAS Braathens. The airline changed its name back to Scandinavian Airlines in 2007. Norwegian Air Shuttle started flights from Kirkenes to Oslo in 2004, at first with four weekly services. The terminal building was almost unchanged since 1963, although it had seen some smaller upgrades. Avinor decided in 2004 that the terminal would be upgraded, consisting a new road to the airport, parking lot, tarmac and terminal. The investments cost NOK 180 million and opened on 4 May 2006. Widerøe reopened its Murmansk service in August 2007, but low patronage caused the airline to terminate the route from December 2008. SAS reduced from two to one daily trip to Oslo in 2008.

== Facilities ==
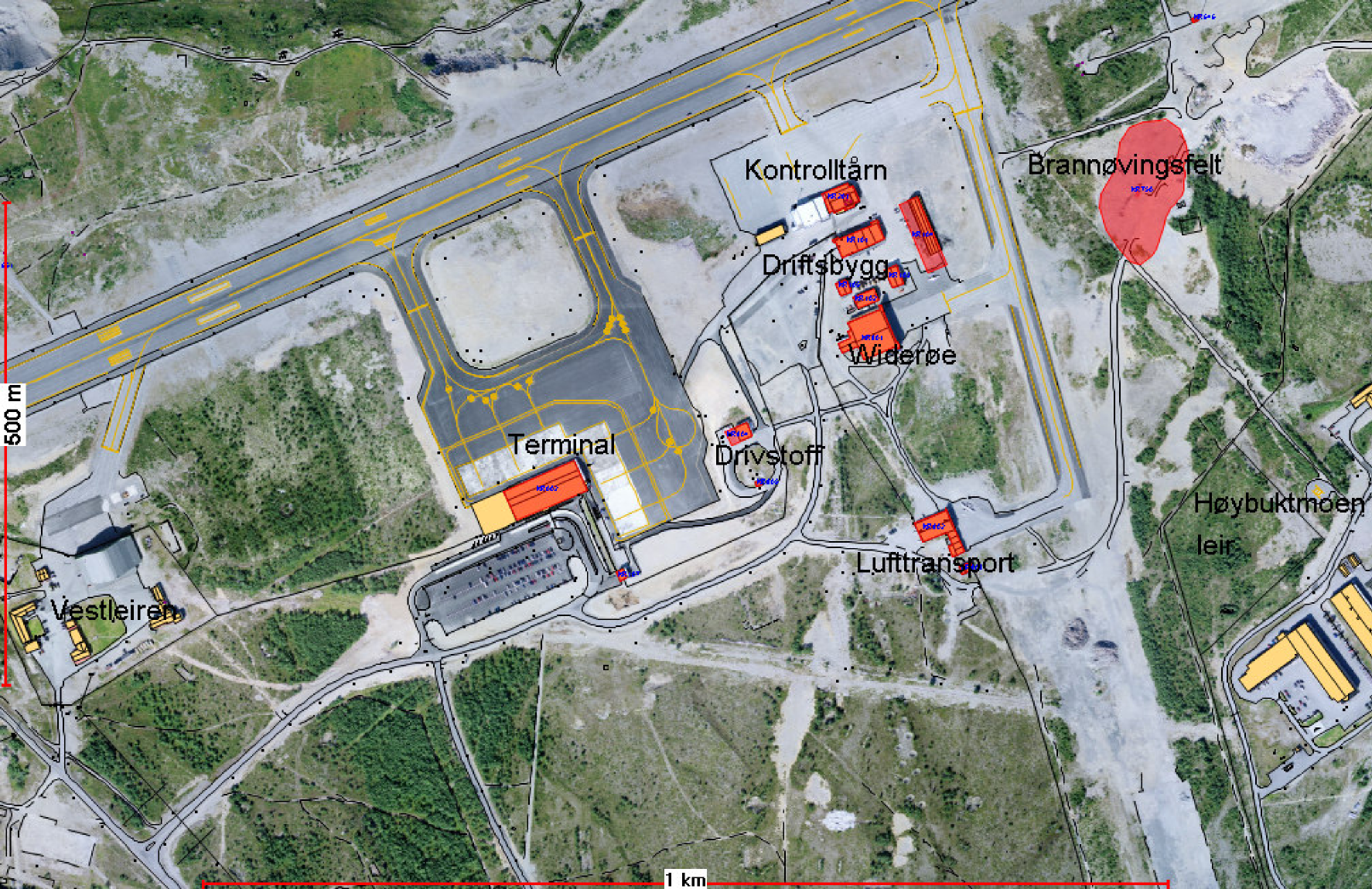
Map of the terminal building and surrounding facilities

The airport is located at Høybuktmoen in Sør-Varanger, about 15 kilometers (9 mi) west of Kirkenes. The terminal has room for six category C aircraft (Airbus A320/Boeing 737). During summer the airport experiences a very high traffic peak with both scheduled and charter aircraft arriving at the same time, as both intend to correspond with Hurtigruten; this causes patronage to rise beyond the airport's capacity. Kirkenes Airport had a revenue of NOK 26.4 million in 2009, of which commercial income made up fifteen percent, and an operating deficit of NOK 45.4 million. The deficit is cross subsidized by profits at Avinor's largest airports. In 2013, the airport had 297,149 passengers, 8,643 aircraft movements and 367 tonnes of cargo.

The runway is located southwest–northeast (05-23) and is 2,015 by 45 meters (6,611 ft × 148 ft). The touchdown zone from the west is 60 meters (200 ft) from the start of the runway, while it is 420 meters (1,380 ft) from the east. There are no parallel taxiways, but two taxiways run from the runway to the tarmac. Because of the terrain to the east the maximum take-off and landing lengths on the runway vary depending on the direction: the landing length (LDA) is only 1,605 meters (5,266 ft) from the east (rwy 23) compared to 1,906 meters (6,253 ft) from the west (rwy 05). Runway 23 is equipped with instrument landing system. There is also a closed runway (14–32) crossing the main runway. It is 1,270 meters (4,170 ft) long and gravel; part of the length has been paved and is used as a taxiway.

The airport is located next to European Road E6. Boreal Transport operates an airport coach service from Kirkenes to the airport in connection with all arrivals and departures. The company also serves the airport with coach services from Kirkenes to other parts of Finnmark. Parking, taxis and car rental is available at the airport.

== Airlines and destinations ==
Three airlines serve the airport with scheduled flights. Scandinavian Airlines (SAS) and Norwegian Air Shuttle both operate a daily flights to Oslo, Norwegian use Boeing 737and SAS use Airbus A320-200neo. Widerøe flies to various regional airports in Finnmark and Troms, and uses Kirkenes as a hub to feed regional passengers to Oslo flights. Widerøe operates its eight daily services with de Havilland Canada Dash 8 aircraft. Hamburg International operates charter services from Germany from May to September on behalf of Hurtigruten with tourist transferring to the Hurtigruten coastal village. There are sporadic charters of fishermen operated by Atlantic Airways.

Airlines	Destinations
Finnair	Helsinki, Ivalo
Norwegian Air Shuttle	Oslo, Tromsø
Scandinavian Airlines	Oslo
Widerøe	Alta, Båtsfjord, Berlevåg, Hammerfest, Honningsvåg, Mehamn, Sørkjosen, Tromsø, Vadsø, Vardø

== Statistics ==
Annual passenger traffic
Year	Passengers	% Change
2025	328,364	▲11.0%
2024	295,855	▲5.3%
2023	280,896	▲13.7%
2022	247,107	▲31.6%
2021	187,808	▲14.7%
2020	163,718	▼ -48.2%
2019	316,268	▲0.1%
2018	315,915	▼ -0.7%
2017	318,194	▲1.2%
2016	314,555	▲1.1%
2015	311,016	

== Future ==
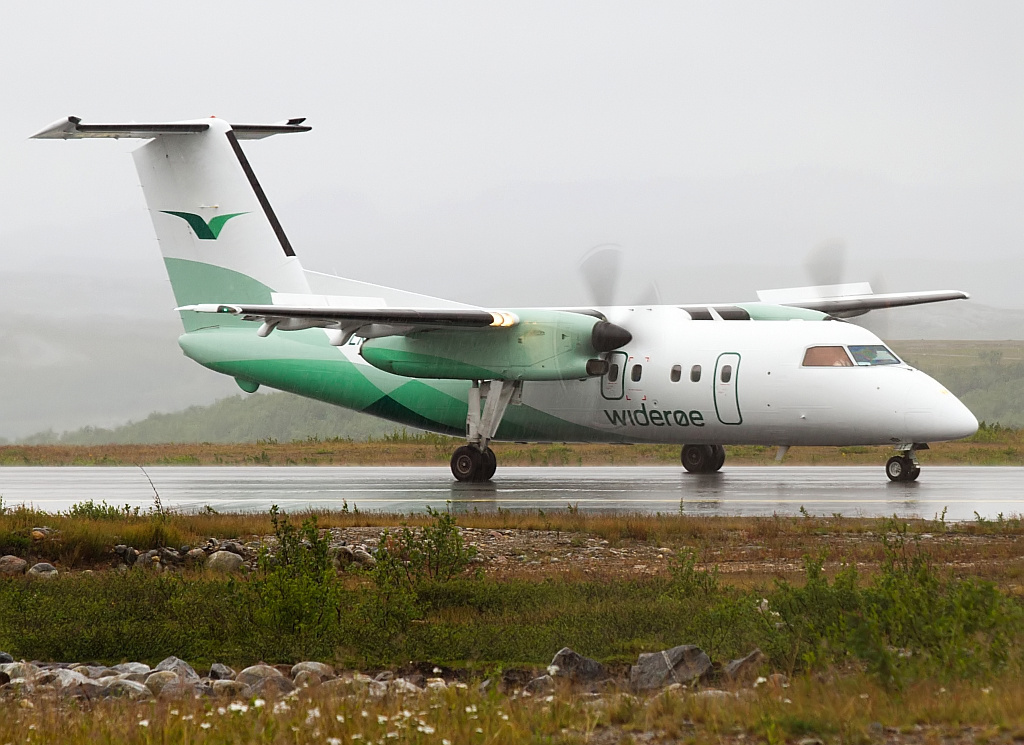
Widerøe Dash 8-100

In the period 2015 to 2020, Avinor plans to build a new control tower and a new fire- and rescue station. The former is located too close to the runway while the latter is too small and out of date. There are also plans to expand the terminal building to allow the simultaneous handling of two large and two small aircraft. Finnmark County Municipality is considering establishing a fast ferry service between Kirkenes and Vadsø which would have a service time of 45 minutes. There is a possibility of marketing Kirkenes as an alternative airport for Murmansk as Kirkenes can offer cheaper flights to Oslo than what is available from Murmansk to Moscow.

Avinor has also proposed lowering the terrain east of the airport. The terrain is actually flatter to the east, but because the runway was expanded in that direction, the extension cannot be used without removing all ground in the twelve-degree slope. Although it has no impact on smaller aircraft, the reduced runway length has a severe impact on the performance of Boeing 737 aircraft, which are used by both Norwegian and SAS. For instance, during winter a 180-seat 737-800 can only utilize 71 percent of its permitted take-off weight; this would hinder fully loaded aircraft flying further than Oslo. The impacts for 150-seat 737-700 aircraft are smaller, as they can reach Oslo during winter and Berlin during summer. The airport served 169,428 passengers in 1996 and 216,000 passengers in 2000.

The project was estimated to cost 267 million Norwegian krone. Estimates show that the benefit for society would be lower than the investment costs (a negative net present value), giving an average estimated NOK 124 million deficit. Norwegian Air Shuttle is building a unified fleet of 737-800 aircraft and will only be able to serve the airport during winter if the investments are carried out. The extension would allow increased charter traffic to Central Europe and increased regularity with existing flights. Avinor has stated that it cannot finance the investments without direct subsidies from the state.
