= Bolterdalen =

Valley of Spitsbergen, Norway

Coordinates: 78.1438°N 15.9867°E

Bolterdalen is a valley in Nordenskiöld Land at Spitsbergen, Svalbard. It is located south of Adventdalen, and the Bolterelva river flows through the valley.
