= Ålesund Heliport, Hospital =

- IATA: none; ICAO: ENAX

Summary
- Airport type: Private
- Owner: Møre og Romsdal Hospital Trust
- Operator: Lufttransport
- Serves: Ålesund, Norway
- Location: Ålesund Hospital, Åse, Ålesund
- Coordinates: 62.463°N 6.3123°E

Map
- Location within Norway

Helipads
Number	Length		Surface
Number	m	ft	Surface
	25	82	Asphalt

Ålesund Heliport, Hospital (Norwegian: Ålesund helikopterplass, Sykehuset) is a heliport situated on the premises of Ålesund Hospital in Ålesund, Norway. Used exclusively for air ambulance services, it is home to an AgustaWestland AW139 operated by Lufttransport on contract with the Norwegian Air Ambulance. The base is owned by the Møre og Romsdal Hospital Trust. The base opened in 1988.

== History ==
The Ministry of Health and Social Affairs appointed a commission which in 1986 recommended that a national state-funded helicopter ambulance service be established. Ålesund Central Hospital was selected as one of eight helicopter bases. Ålesund Airport, Vigra was selected as a base for a fixed-wing ambulance. Until 1992 the base covered the northern parts of Sogn og Fjordane, until the opening of Førde Heliport, Central Hospital.

The first operating contract was awarded to Mørefly, including both the heliport and the airport operations, and lasted until 31 December 1992. It succeeded as renewing its contract, which lasted until 31 December 1998. However, the service was later transferred to Lufttransport, a sister company of Mørefly. Operations at this time were provided using a Eurocopter SA365. Medical personnel during this period was provided by Møre og Romsdal County Municipality, consisting of ten physicians and nine nurses, all in a half position at with the helicopter service.

== Facilities ==
The heliport is situated on the premises of Ålesund Hospital, situated east of the center of the town of Ålesund, in the village of Åse. The facility is owned and operated by Møre og Romsdal Hospital Trust, part of Western Norway Regional Health Authority. The helipad is placed next the building complex used by the helicopter, along with a hangar. The helipad has a diameter of 25.5 meters (84 ft) and a safety area of 30 meters (98 ft). From the helipad there is a 70-meter (230 ft) path to the emergency department of the hospital.

== Operations ==
The ambulance helicopter is operated by Lufttransport on contract with the National Air Ambulance Service. They have an AgustaWestland AW139 stationed at the heliport. The helicopter has room for a crew of three, consisting of a pilot, rescue swimming and an anesthesiologist, as well as two stretchers. Medical staff are provided by the University Hospital of North Norway. The helicopter flew 752 missions lasting 676 hours in 2013. From 2005 to 2011 the base was used an average 15 times annually by the Sea King rescue helicopters.

== Bibliography ==
- Ministry of Health, Social Affairs (1998). Luftambulansetjenesten i Norge (PDF) (in Norwegian). Vol. 8.
