= Lufttransport =

Norwegian airline

IATA	ICAO	Call sign
L5	LTR	LUFTTRANSPORT
- Founded: 1971
- Hubs: Tromsø Airport
- Fleet size: 24
- Parent company: Knut Axel Ugland Holding
- Headquarters: Tromsø, Norway
- Key people: Stig Næsh (CEO)
- Website: lufttransport.no

Lufttransport is a Norwegian helicopter and fixed-wing airline that operates primarily air ambulance helicopters and planes for the Norwegian and Swedish governments. In addition the airline offers services including surveillance for the Norwegian Coast Guard, transport of ship pilots and scheduled air transport in the Norwegian territory of Svalbard.

The airline operates 10 helicopters and 14 fixed-wing aircraft and has headquarters in Tromsø. In 2005 the company had a revenue of 300 million NOK.

== History ==
=== Early history ===
Lufttransport was established in 1971 with a base at Bardufoss Airport. By 1973 it had a revenue of 1.3 million Norwegian kroner and four employees. It expanded in 1978 after it was awarded contracts to fly services out of Svalbard Airport, Longyear in 1978. This included both flights for the mining company Store Norske and the research institute Kings Bay to Ny-Ålesund Airport, Hamnerabben.

The company's largest growth came in 1980, when took steps to start flying offshore services. Lufttransport was seen as a credible competitor to the then monopolist Helikopter Service. In 1982 both Statoil and Norsk Hydro signed three-year contracts with a combined value of 300 million kroner to fly to installations in the Norwegian Sea off Northern Norway. For these routes, six Aerospatiale AS 332L Super Pumas were procured between 1983 and 1985. The airline was also awarded a contract with Saga Petroleum to operate offshore flights in Benin. By 1984 the airline reach a revenue of 170 million kroner, with 110 employees, after it started flights to Trænabanken and Tromsøflaket, the latter based out of Tromsø Airport. It also established a base at Bergen Airport, Flesland where Statoil used Lufttransport for some flights to Statfjord.

A fall in the oil price had resulted in a reduced willingness for the oil companies to pay higher prices to Lufttransport in order to entice competition The three-year contract with Statoil and Norsk Hydro was not extended, leaving the company in financial dire straits. Lufttransport therefore contacted Helikopter Service, resulting in a merger from 1 January 1987. Helikopter Service took over all offshore operations, while land-based services continued in the subsidiary Lufttransport.

=== Merger with Mørefly ===
Helikopter Service bought another mid-sized helicopter and fixed-wing operator, the Ålesund-based Mørefly, in 1992. Also there the mother company took over all offshore operations and left only the land-based flights for Mørefly. Due to the similarities in profile, Mørefly and Lufttransport were merged in 1995. Tromsø was selected as the new company's head office and it also retained the name Lufttransport. However, it retained the air operator's certificate and organization number of Mørefly, which had been founded in 1955.

At the time of the merger, Mørefly was one of the two large air ambulance operators in Norway, along with Norsk Luftambulanse. In addition to its main base at Ålesund Airport, Vigra, there were fixed-wing air ambulance bases at Brønnøysund Airport, Brønnøy; Bodø Airport; Tromsø Airport; Alta Airport; and Kirkenes Airport, Høybuktmoen, served by six Beechcraft King Air. A Dauphin 2 was flown out of Ålesund Heliport, Central Hospital. It also held a contract with the Norwegian Coast Guard to fly maritime surveillance over the North Sea.

Helikopter Service sold Lufttransport in 2000 to Norwegian Air Shuttle, at the time a regional airline. It sold Lufttransport and the Swedish operator Heliflyg in 2005 to Norsk Helikopter, Helikopter Service's main competitor. It sold Lufttransport to Knut Axel Ugland Holding three years later, in a deal which saw Ugland sell its 51 percent of Norsk Helikopter to the Bristow Group.

The company returned to offshore flights in 2004, when it won a two-year contract to fly all services in the Norwegian sector for Teekay, later Teekay Petrojarl. The contract has been renewed numerous times.

Lufttransport commenced scheduled passenger services on the route from Bodø Airport to Værøy Heliport in 2005. It won the public service obligation tender, valid from 1 August 2005, ahead of Helikopter Service with a bid of NOK 56 million. Lufttransport renewed the contract for a new three years starting 1 August 2008, after they were the only bidder in the tender. They received NOK 102 million for three years. During this period better navigational aids were installed, allowing helicopters to operate during twice per day also during the dark period of the year. Lufttransport was the only bidder for the following contract, which lasts three years from 1 August 2011. The subsidies for this period are NOK 96 million.

The company started operations on Svalbard in 1978, transporting crew from the new international airport at Longyearbyen to the mines at Svea and Ny-Ålesund. From 1994 the airline has operated Dornier 228 aircraft at Svalbard. Since 2002 the company has co-operated with the shipping pilot service in Bergen, flying pilots out to vessels at sea.

In 2000 its owner CHC Helikopter Service, part of CHC Helicopter, sold Lufttransport to Norwegian Air Shuttle. In 2005 Norwegian sold Lufttransport and the Swedish Heliflyg to Norsk Helikopter. As part of a restructuring of its operations, Norsk Helikopter (now fully owned by Bristow Group) sold Lufttransport in its entirety to Knut Axel Ugland Holding in October 2008.

== Operations ==
=== Ambulance ===
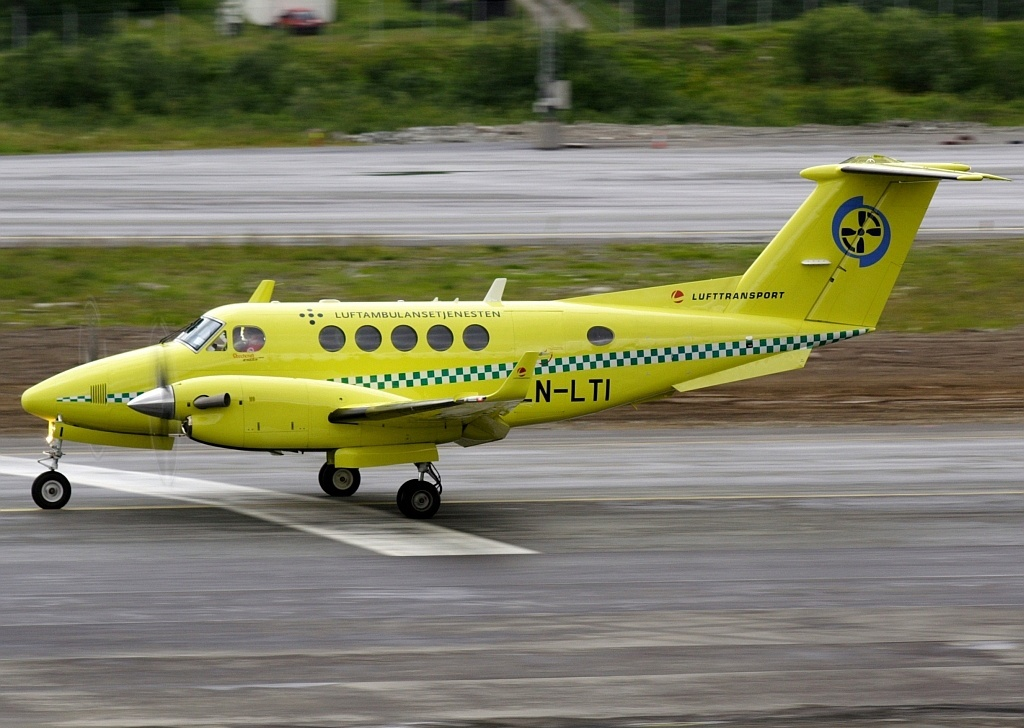
Beechcraft King Air air ambulance at Tromsø Airport

In Norway Lufttransport has Beech King Air B200 ambulance planes stationed at

- 1 Kirkenes Airport, Høybuktmoen
- 2 Alta Airport
- 1 Bodø Airport
- 1 Brønnøysund Airport, Brønnøy
- 2 Oslo Airport, Gardermoen
- 1 Tromsø Airport
- 1 Ålesund Airport, Vigra

It also has helicopter bases at

- Brønnøysund Hospital AW139
- University Hospital of North Norway Tromsø AW139
- Ålesund Hospital AW139

=== Svalbard ===
The airline also has two Dornier 228 aircraft stationed at Svalbard Airport, Longyear that fly regular charter flights to Ny-Ålesund Airport, Hamnerabben and Svea Airport for the mining company Store Norske Spitsbergen Kulkompani and the company in charge of the research village of Ny-Ålesund, Kings Bay. One of the Dornier aircraft also carries out surveillance for the Norwegian Coast Guard, primarily checking fishing boats in the Barents Sea. Lufttransport flies about 400 hours per year for the Coast Guard.

From August 29, 2019, one of the aircraft was fitted with high-resolution sensors and advanced communication equipment provided by NORCE research centre making it the first passenger aircraft equipped for environmental monitoring.

=== Ship pilots ===
Two Agusta helicopters based at Bergen Airport, Flesland were used to transport ship pilots until 1 July 2017, at which time the contract was won by another Norwegian company, Airlift AS. Ships exceeding 30 000 gross tons with petroleum products are required to have a pilot onboard while navigating into the petroleum refineries of Kårstø, Mongstad and Sture. In addition the company has a contract to fly crew to Teekay Petrojarl's ships in the North Sea

=== Værøy ===
Lufttransport flies the public service obligation between Bodø Airport and Værøy Heliport with two daily round trips (one trip on Saturdays and Sundays) with an Agusta Bell AB139.

== Fleet ==
As of August 2017 the Lufttransport fleet includes:

- 1 Dornier 228-200
- 1 Dornier 228-200 Next Generation (NG)
- 11 Beech King Air B200
- 2 Eurocopter AS332L1 Super Puma
- 3 Eurocopter AS365N3 Dauphin
- 5 AgustaWestland AW139

== Bibliography ==
- Hagby, Kay (1998). Fra Nielsen & Winther til Boeing 747 (in Norwegian). Drammen: Hagby. ISBN 8299475201.
- Hjelle, Bjørn Owe (2007). Ålesund lufthavn Vigra (in Norwegian). Valderøya. ISBN 978-82-92055-28-1.
- Olsen-Hagen, Bernt Charles (2014). Offshore Helicopters: Helikopteraktiviteten på norsk kontinentalsokkel. Aviation Forlag. ISBN 978-82-999547-0-9.
