= Svea Airport =

Svea Airport Svea flyplass
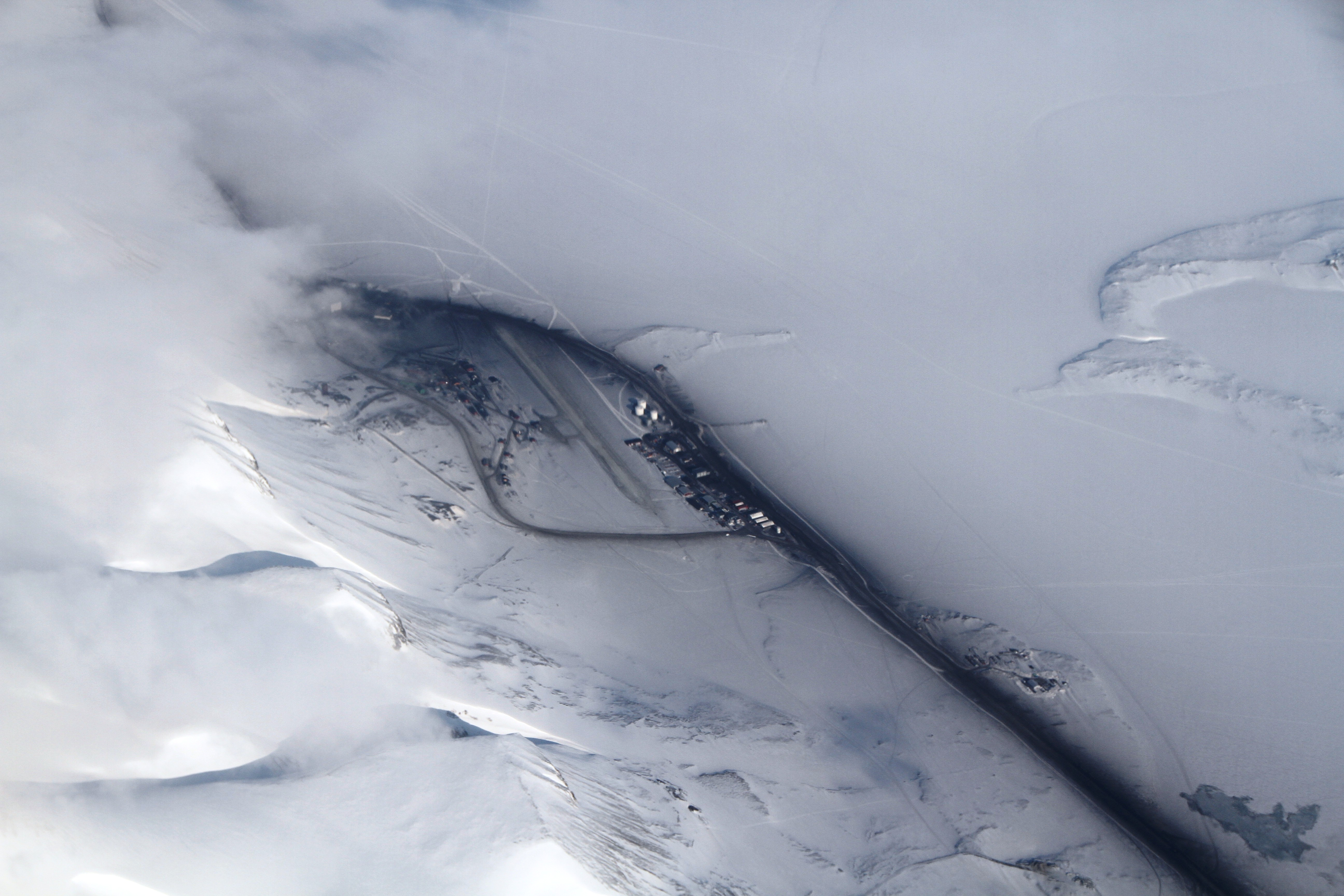
- IATA: none; ICAO: ENSA

Summary
- Airport type: Private
- Operator: Store Norske Spitsbergen Kulkompani
- Serves: Sveagruva, Svalbard, Norway
- Opened: February 16, 1995
- Closed: August 1, 2022
- Elevation AMSL: 10 m / 32 ft
- Coordinates: 77°53′49″N 016°43′30″E

Map

Runways
Direction	Length		Surface
Direction	m	ft	Surface
04/22	800	2,625	Gravel

Svea Airport (Norwegian: Svea flyplass; ICAO: ENSA) is a private airport located in and serving the Sveagruva (also known as Svea) former mining settlement in Svalbard, Norway. The airport was owned and operated by Store Norske Spitsbergen Kulkompani, who used the airport to transport their coal mining workers from the company town to Svalbard Airport at Longyearbyen. The airport featured a gravel runway measuring 800 by 30 meters (2,625 by 98 ft). Flights were operated about thirty times per week by Lufttransport using their two Dornier 228s. The airport was closed on August 1, 2022.

== History ==
The need for an airport at Svea arose during the mid 1990s. Store Norske, which had until then been mining coal in Longyearbyen, was in the process of moving the bulk of its mining operations to Svea. A road between the two towns was out of the question for environmental reasons. The company proposed that Svea would be built as a dorm town, where workers would commute for the week. They would have their permanent homes and families in Longyearbyen. On 10 April 1994, Store Norske's board stated that they could not support the two main alternatives, construction of an all-new permanent dwelling town in Svea, and commuting from the mainland. Store Norske cited their commitment to keep Longyearbyen a vibrant community.

The airport was officially opened on 16 February 1995. In March 1996, Store Norske, Kings Bay, and Lufttransport signed an agreement concerning intra-island transport out of Longyearbyen. This involved the introduction of Dornier 228 aircraft, which operated for Store Norske to Svea and for Kings Bay to Ny-Ålesund Airport, Hamnerabben. Store Norske commenced construction of the new town and mine, and mining operations started in January 1997.

The airport was closed on 1 August 2022, after the mine was closed and the town demolished.

== Facilities ==
The airport was located in the settlement of Sveagruva. Just like the rest of the company town, it was owned and operated by Store Norske. Svea Airport was situated at 10 meters (32 ft) above mean sea level, on the north shore of van Mijenfjorden. It consisted of a gravel runway aligned 04–22 (roughly northeast–southwest), which measures 800 by 30 meters (2,625 by 98 ft).

== Airlines and destinations ==
Svea Airport was a private airport and not open to public flights, or any non-emergency landings by any flights not chartered by Store Norske. All flights at Svea flew to Svalbard Airport, Longyear. They were operated by Lufttransport, who operated two nineteen-seat Dornier 228 aircraft on the service. The airline operated up to thirty flights per week. These were only available for employees of and others traveling for Store Norske. Lufttransport transported 21,000 people and 500 tonnes of freight annually on its Svalbard routes, the vast majority of which was on the Svea route.

Airlines	Destinations
Lufttransport	Charter: Longyearbyen

== Bibliography ==
- Martinussen, Berit (2005). Et arktisk omstillingseventyr 1987–2005 (in Norwegian). Longyearbyen: Store Norske. ISBN 82-992462-2-9.
- Thusesen, Nils Petter (2005). Svalbards historie i årstall (in Norwegian). Oslo: Orion. ISBN 82-458-0742-7.
- Andreassen, Rune N. (2021-06-06). "Her skal flyplassen rives og byen fjernes" [Here the airport is being demolished and the town removed] (in Norwegian Bokmål). NRK.
