= Adventdalen =

Valley of Spitsbergen, Norway

Coordinates: 78.2122°N 15.8°E

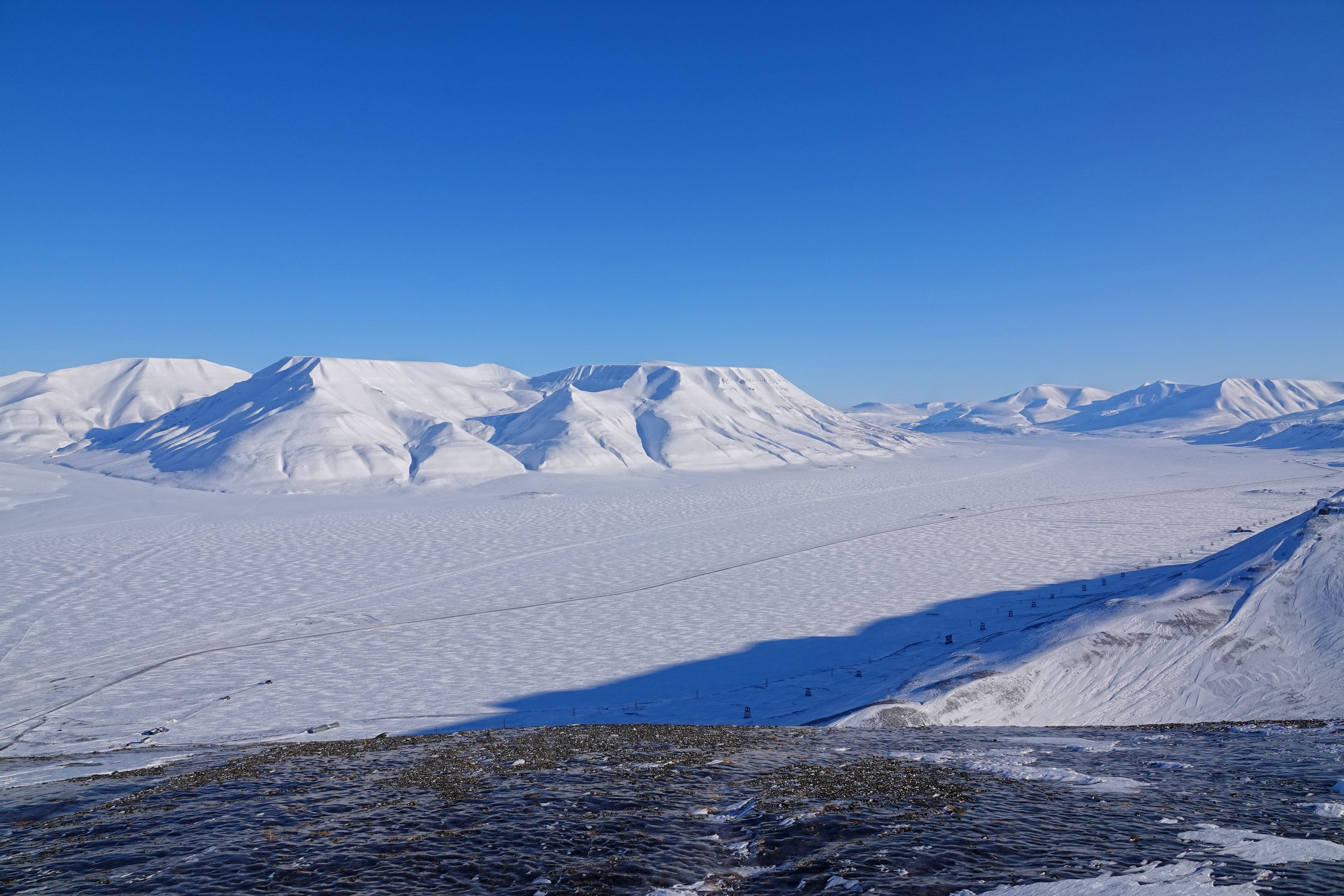
Adventdalen, west to east, seen from above Longyearbyen

Adventdalen (English: Advent Valley) is a 30-kilometre (19 mi) valley on the island Spitsbergen in Svalbard, Norway. The river that runs through the valley, Adventdalselva, flows into Adventfjorden just outside Longyearbyen. Adventfjorden is an arm of Isfjorden.

The valley ends at Haugen in Longyearbyen, close to the University Centre in Svalbard. The valley originates from the mountains Slottet and Tronfjellet, at the glaciers Hellefonna and Drønbreen. It runs westwards towards the fjord. From northwest, the branch valleys are: Mälardalen, Helvetiadalen, Eskerdalen, Janssondalen, Foxdalen, Bolterdalen, Todalen and Endalen.

There are several coal mines on the southern side of the valley, with road access from Longyearbyen. Mine 5 and 6 are closed, while Mine 7 is the last remaining Norwegian coal mine as of 2023, 15 kilometers away from Longyearbyen.

Near Longyearbyen is the fresh water lake Isdammen located in the valley on the southern side of the road. This lake is used as the main water source for the town.

Adventdalen has many snowmobile trails which can be used during the parts of the year when the ground is sufficiently frozen.

In February 2024, James Gunn's Superman used the Adventdalen Valley for shooting in the arctic regions near the film's Fortress of Solitude.

The entire valley has mobile phone coverage.

The name Adventdalen has nothing to do with Norwegian "advent", the Christian term for the period of four weeks before Christmas. The valley got its name from Adventfjorden, which in turn got its name from the English whaling ship Adventure that was based here for a period in 1656.
