= Sveagruva =

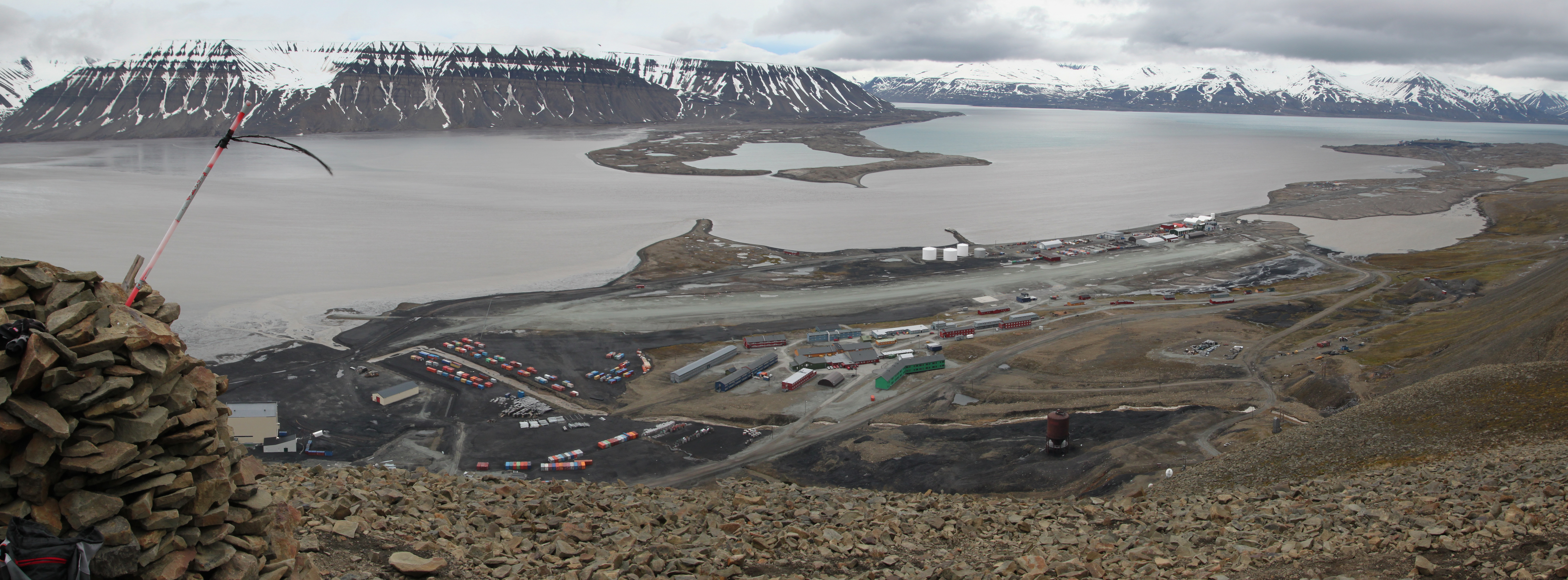
- Sveagruva in 2019

- Location of Sveagruva and Svalbard
- Coordinates: 77°54′00″N 16°43′50″E
- Country: Norway
- Region: Svalbard
- Founded: 1917

Population (2024)
  - Total: 0
- Postal code: 9175

Sveagruva (lit. 'Swedish Mine'), or simply Svea, was a mining settlement in the Norwegian archipelago of Svalbard, lying at the head of Van Mijenfjord. When occupied by the workers, it was the third largest settlement in the archipelago (after Longyearbyen and Barentsburg) but there were no permanent inhabitants. Around 300 workers living in Longyearbyen commuted to Sveagruva for work on a daily or weekly basis. The mine was operated by Store Norske Spitsbergen Kulkompani. There is no road to Longyearbyen or any other settlements, so travel was by air from Svea Airport and coal transport by ship from a port five kilometres (three miles) southwest. Sveagruva closed in 2020 and currently has no permanent inhabitants.

As of 2023, Sveagruva has been re-wilded to a pristine state. Almost every structure from its mining past has been removed in the largest operation of its kind.

== History ==
The town was established in 1917 by Swedes. It was thereafter destroyed in 1944, but quickly re-established after World War II. The mining activity ceased in 1949, and was not re-established until 1970. Mining was suspended for a short period in 1987. In the 1990s, the town nearly vanished, as mines in Longyearbyen proved more productive and accessible. In 2005, a mine fire erupted, lasting uninterrupted for more than five weeks, and causing 700 million Norwegian kroner worth of damage.

Sveagruva held the most productive coal mine of Svalbard, the Svea Nord longwall mine. Opened in 2001, the mine produced up to four million metric tons of coal annually, making it one of the largest underground coal mines in Europe. The mine closed in March 2020.

== Weather and Climate ==
Climate data for Sveagruva
Month	Jan	Feb	Mar	Apr	May	Jun	Jul	Aug	Sep	Oct	Nov	Dec	Year
Mean daily maximum °C (°F)	−13 (9)	−13 (9)	−13 (9)	−9 (16)	−3 (27)	3 (37)	7 (45)	6 (43)	2 (36)	−4 (25)	−8 (18)	−11 (12)	−3 (27)
Daily mean °C (°F)	−16.5 (2.3)	−17 (1)	−16.5 (2.3)	−12.5 (9.5)	−5 (23)	1 (34)	5 (41)	4 (39)	−0.5 (31.1)	−6.5 (20.3)	−11 (12)	−14.5 (5.9)	−6 (21)
Mean daily minimum °C (°F)	−20 (−4)	−21 (−6)	−20 (−4)	−16 (3)	−7 (19)	−1 (30)	3 (37)	2 (36)	−3 (27)	−9 (16)	−14 (7)	−18 (0)	−9.5 (14.9)
Average precipitation mm (inches)	22 (0.9)	28 (1.1)	29 (1.1)	16 (0.6)	13 (0.5)	18 (0.7)	24 (0.9)	30 (1.2)	25 (1.0)	19 (0.7)	22 (0.9)	25 (1.0)	271 (10.7)
Source: Sveagruva Climate Guide
