= Longyearbyen =

Largest settlement and administrative centre of Svalbard, Norway

- Town (de facto capital)
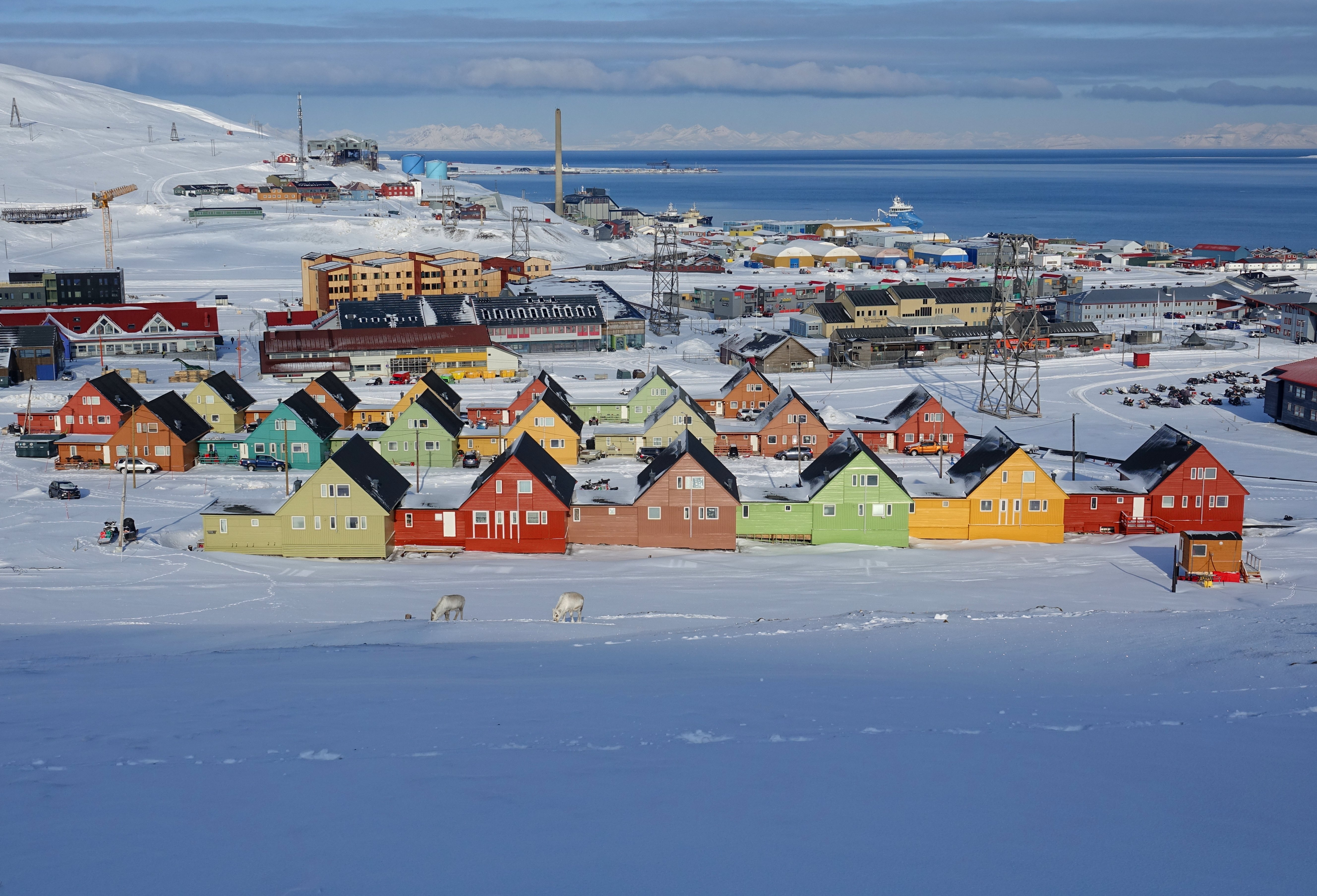
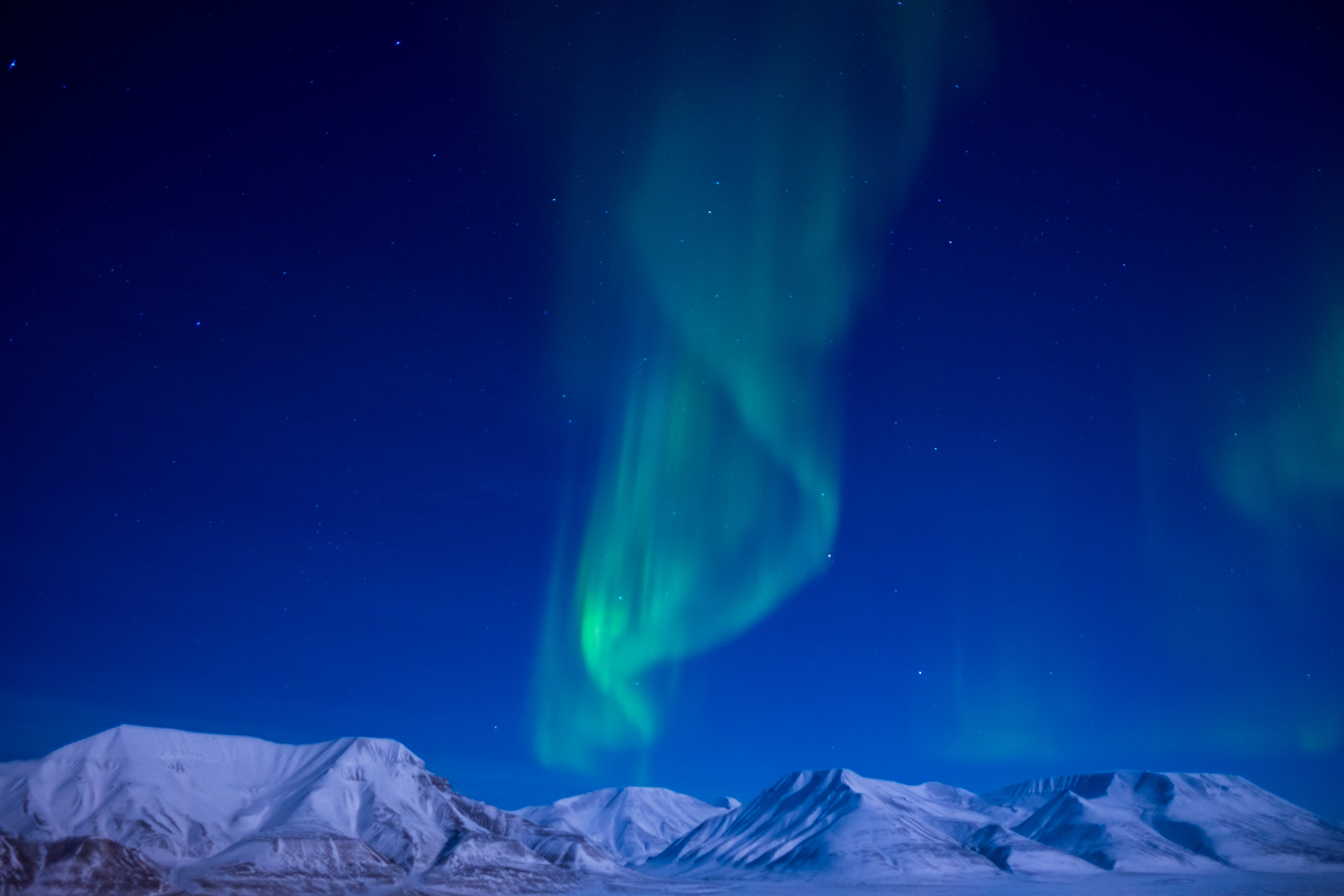
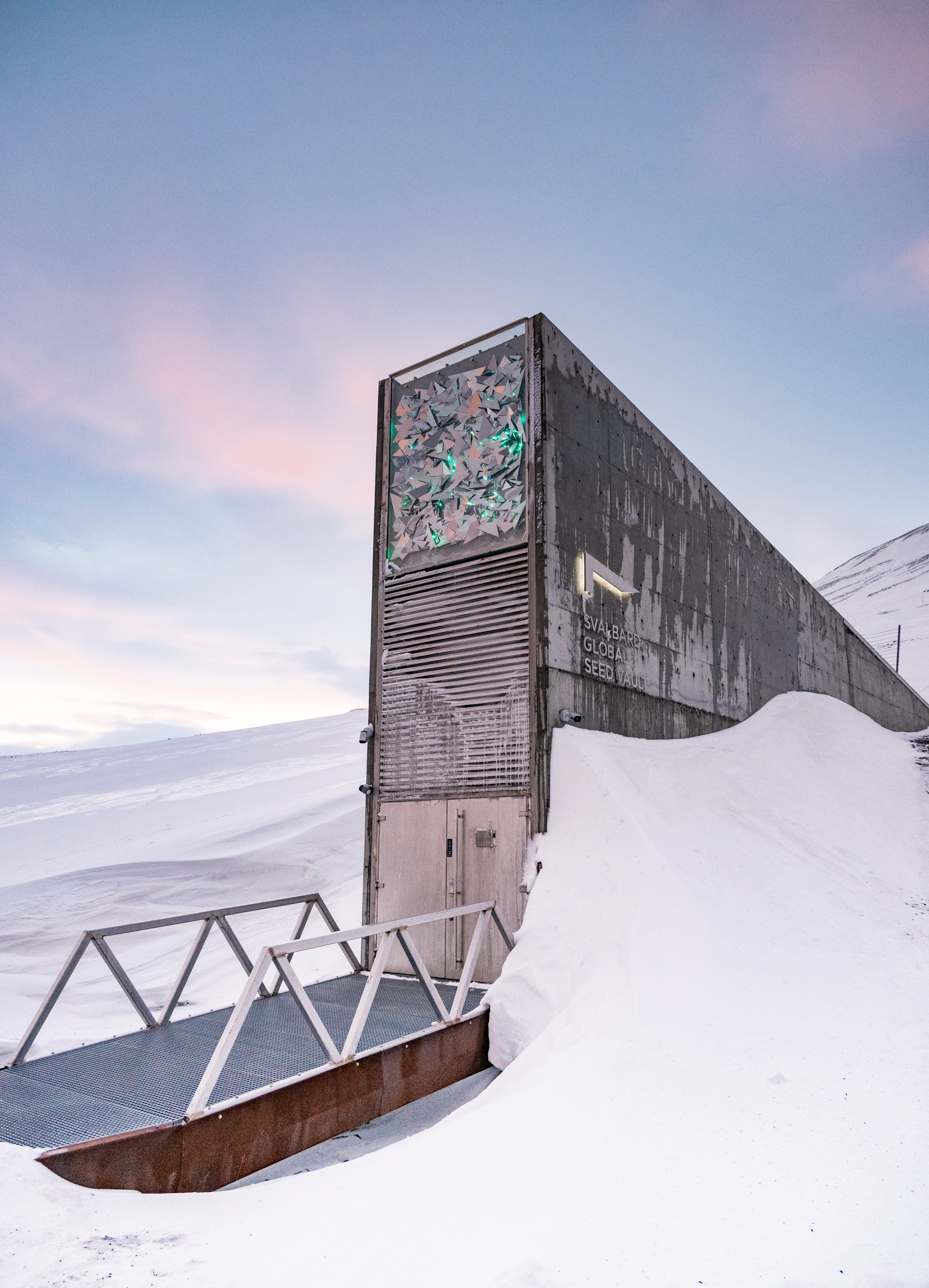
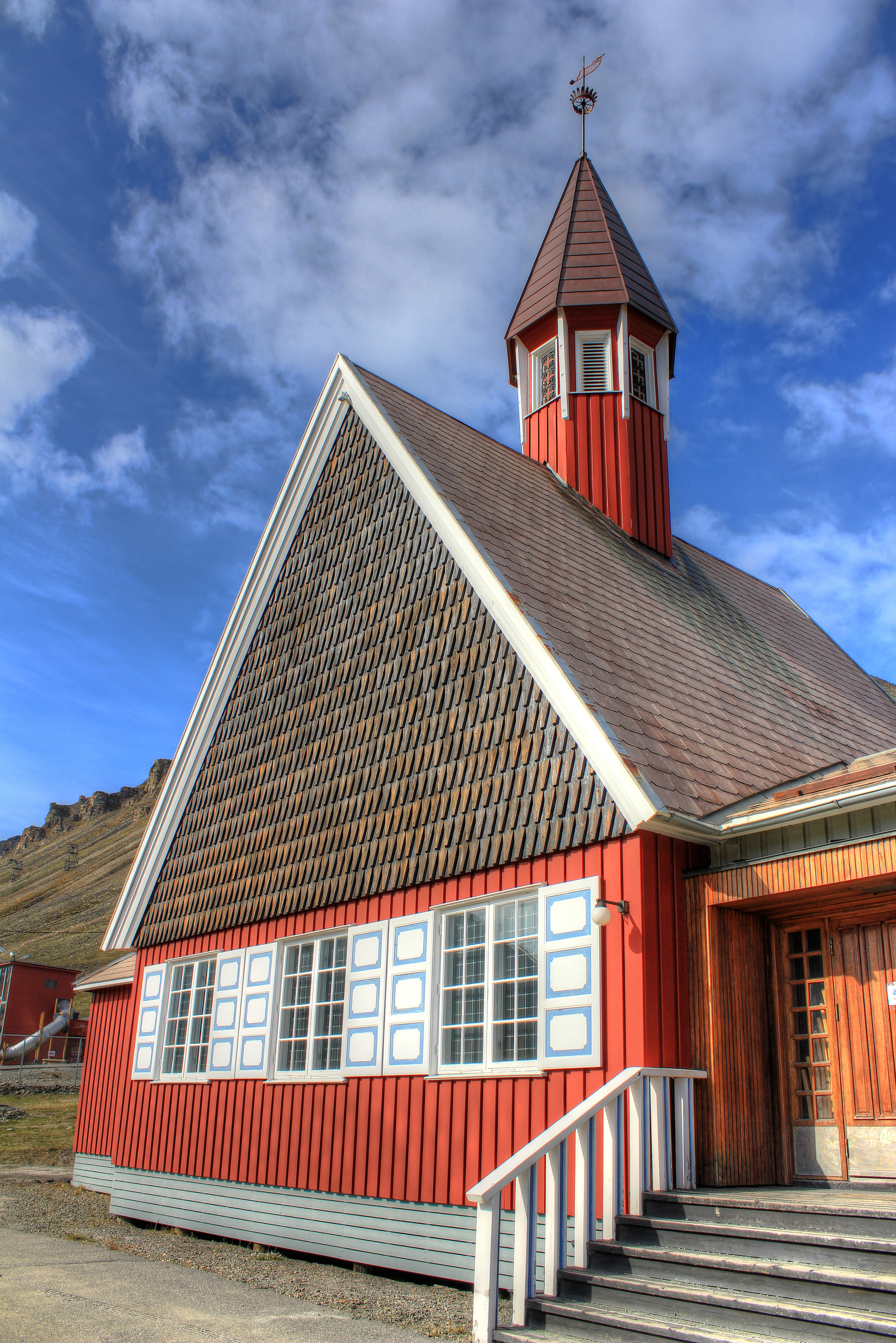
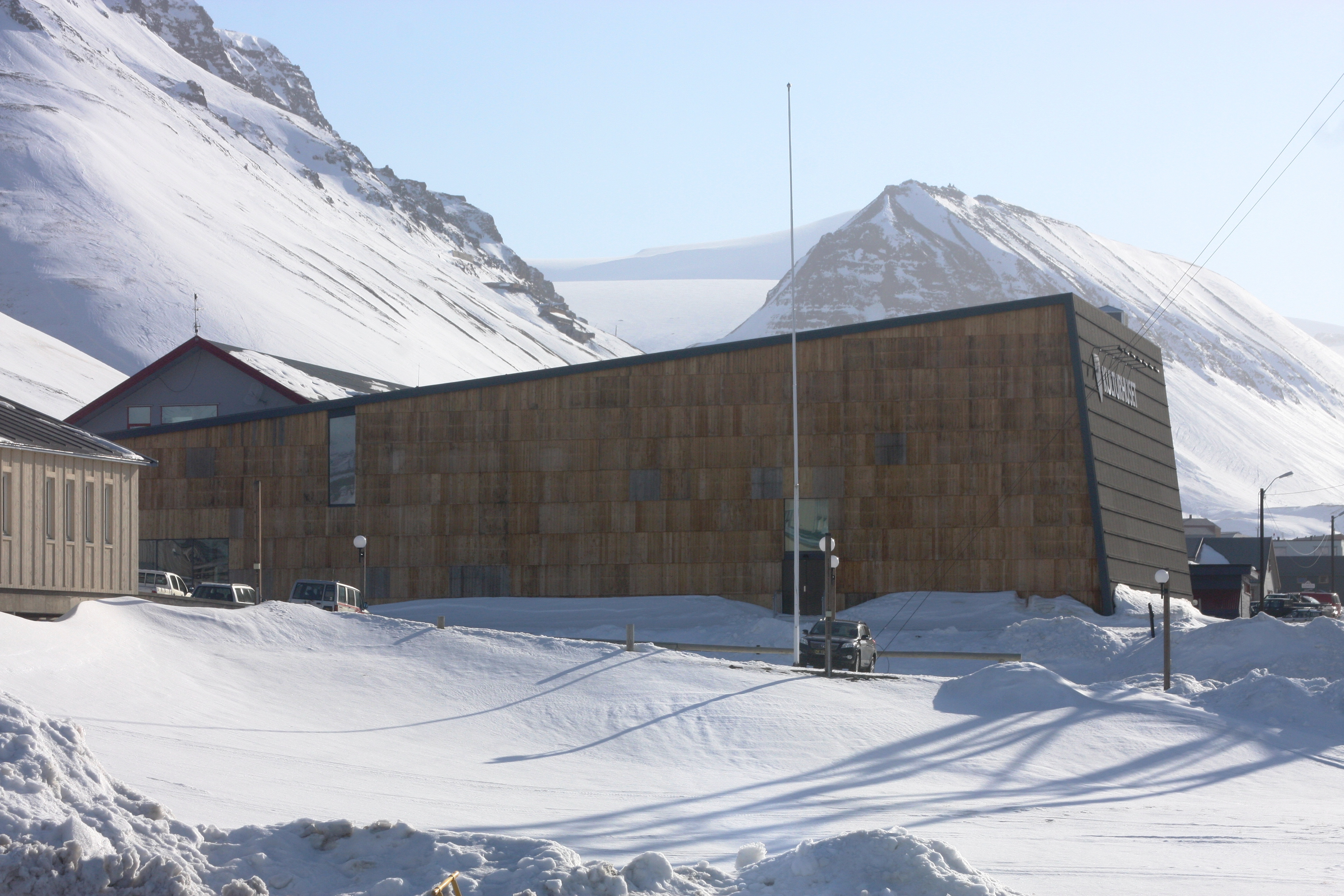
- View of Longyearbyen Aurora above Longyearbyen Global Seed Vault Svalbard Church The Culture House

- Coat of arms

- Location of Longyearbyen (red) in Svalbard

- Location within Arctic Location within Earth
- Coordinates: 78°13′N 15°38′E
- Sovereign state: Norway
- Territory: Svalbard
- Island: Spitsbergen
- Founded: 1907
- Incorporated: 1 January 2002

Government
  - Body: Longyearbyen Community Council
  - Mayor: Leif Terje Aunevik

Area
  - Total: 10 km^{2} (3.9 sq mi)

Population (2026)
  - Total: 2,817 (Note: Includes Ny-Ålesund)
  - Density: 259.5/km^{2} (672/sq mi)
- Postal code: 9170 and 9171
- Website: www.lokalstyre.no

Longyearbyen (Urban East Norwegian: [ˈlɔ̀ŋjɛrˌbyːən], locally [ˈlɔ̀ŋjɑrˌbyːən], 'Longyear town') is the capital and largest settled area of Svalbard, and one of the world's northernmost settlements, with an estimated population of around 2,400–2,800. It stretches along the foot of the left bank of the Longyear Valley and on the shore of Adventfjorden, the short estuary leading into Isfjorden on the west coast of Spitsbergen, the island's broadest inlet. As of 2002, Longyearbyen Community Council is an official Norwegian municipality. It is the seat of the Governor of Svalbard. As of 2024, the town's mayor is Leif Terje Aunevik.

Known as Longyear City until 1926, the town was established by and named after American John Munro Longyear, whose Arctic Coal Company started coal-mining there in 1906. Store Norske Spitsbergen Kulkompani (SNSK) took over the mining operations in 1916, and still conducts mining. The German Kriegsmarine almost completely destroyed the town on 8 September 1943, but rebuilding took place after the Second World War. Historically, Longyearbyen was a company town, but most mining operations moved to Sveagruva during the 1990s, and production ceased in 2017 due to immense financial losses suffered by SNSK since 2014 due to market conditions. Meanwhile, the town has seen a large increase in tourism and research, including the arrival of the University Centre in Svalbard, the Svalbard Global Seed Vault and Svalbard Satellite Station. Svalbard Airport, Svalbard Church and the Svalbardbutikken department store serve the community.

As of 2021, Longyearbyen was the fastest-warming town in the world.

== History ==
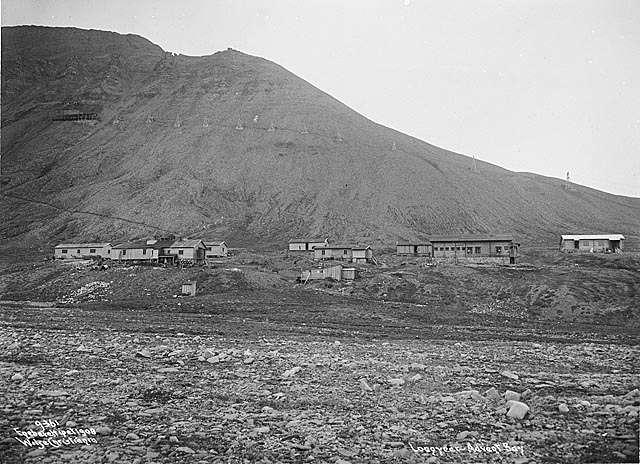
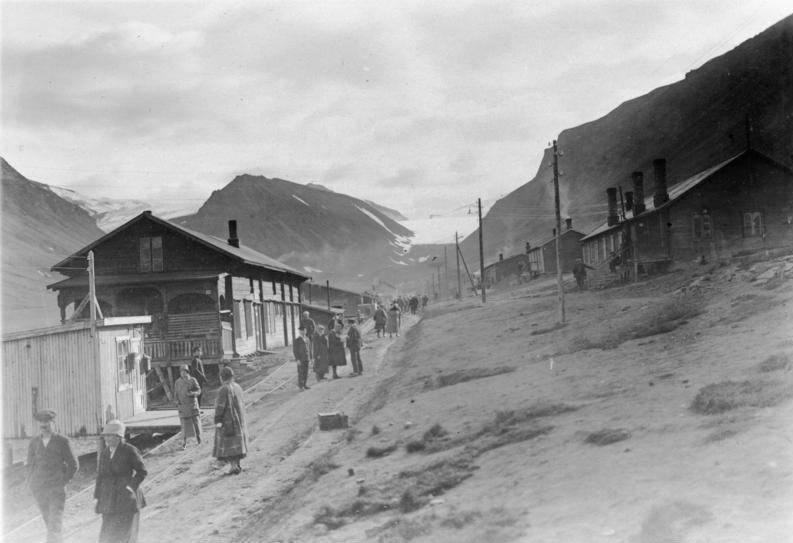
Longyear City in 1908 (top) and 1925 (bottom)

=== Early 20th century ===
In 1896, Vesteraalens Dampskibsselskab started tours to Hotellneset. To accommodate tourists, they built a prefabricated hotel, but it was not profitable and was closed after the 1897 season. However, two families overwintered in 1898–99, and Norway Post operated a post office at Hotellneset from 1897 to 1899. The first commercially viable coal on Svalbard was harvested by Søren Zakariassen in 1899. In 1901, Bergen-Spitsbergen Kullgrube-kompani started mining coal in Adventtoppen.

The American industrialist John Munro Longyear visited Spitsbergen as a tourist in 1901, and met with an expedition prospecting for coal. In 1903, he returned to Spitsbergen, where he met Henrik B. Næss in Adventfjorden, who gave him samples and information on coal fields. Along with his associate Frederick Ayer, Longyear bought the Norwegian claims on the west side of Adventfjorden, and expanded the claims significantly the following year. In 1906, the Boston-based Arctic Coal Company, with Ayer and Longyear as the main shareholders, started mining in Mine 1a, after building docks and housing. The company had American administration, but mostly Norwegian labourers, and named the town Longyear City. Coal was transported the 1.2 kilometres (0.75 mi) from the mine to the port using an aerial tramway built by the aerial cableway company Adolf Bleichert & Co. of Leipzig, Germany. In 1913, the company started preliminary work to open Mine 2a.

Following financial difficulties during the First World War, the mining operations were bought by Store Norske, which was incorporated in Kristiania (renamed Oslo in 1926) on 30 November 1916. That year, SNSK built five new barracks, including one that was made into a hospital. SNSK introduced its own money with the approval of Norges Bank, consisting entirely of banknotes at par with Norwegian krone. The American community buried their dead at Hotellneset. In 1918, eleven people were killed by the Spanish flu and a graveyard was established in Longyear City. Two years later, 26 men were killed in a coal dust explosion in Mine 1. This resulted in the mine being closed and the electrification of Mine 2. The same year, the first truck was delivered for use in the mining operations.

The Church of Norway appointed Thorleif Østenstad as Svalbard's first vicar and teacher in 1920. A school was established jointly by the church and SNSK and had an inaugural eight pupils. The first church in Svalbard opened on 28 August 1921, and the church's reading room was from then on used as a school. Longyear City was renamed Longyearbyen in 1926.

The Norwegian Telecommunications Administration established a coast radio station, Svalbard Radio, at Finneset in 1911, which was moved to Longyearbyen in 1930. The town's tourist industry started in 1935, when SS Lyngen started calling regularly during the summer season. In 1937, SNSK established Sverdrupbyen to house workers for Mine 1b, and operation of the mine started in 1939. In 1938, Longyearbyen's first road was completed, between the town centre and Sverdrupbyen. Operations at Mine 2b, a different entrance to Mine 2a, started in 1939.

Svalbard remained unaffected by the German occupation of Norway in 1940. However, from 1941 the archipelago became of strategic importance in the supply chain between the Allied powers, as well as a source of badly needed coal. The Norwegian government-in-exile rejected a Soviet–British occupation; instead the British Army started Operation Gauntlet to evacuate Spitsbergen. On 29 August 1941, the entire population of Ny-Ålesund was evacuated to Longyearbyen, and on 3 September 765 people were evacuated from Longyearbyen to Scotland. Later, the last 150 men were also evacuated. With Longyearbyen depopulated, a small German garrison and air strip were established in Adventdalen, mostly to provide meteorological data. After the British Operation Fritham regained control of Barentsburg, the German forces left Longyearbyen without combat.

In September 1943, the Kriegsmarine dispatched two battleships, Tirpitz and Scharnhorst, and nine destroyers to bombard Longyearbyen, Barentsburg and Grumant. Only four buildings in Longyearbyen survived: the hospital, the power station, an office building, and a residential building. Longyearbyen remained unsettled until the end of the war, with the first ship from the mainland leaving on 27 June 1945.

=== Post-Second World War ===
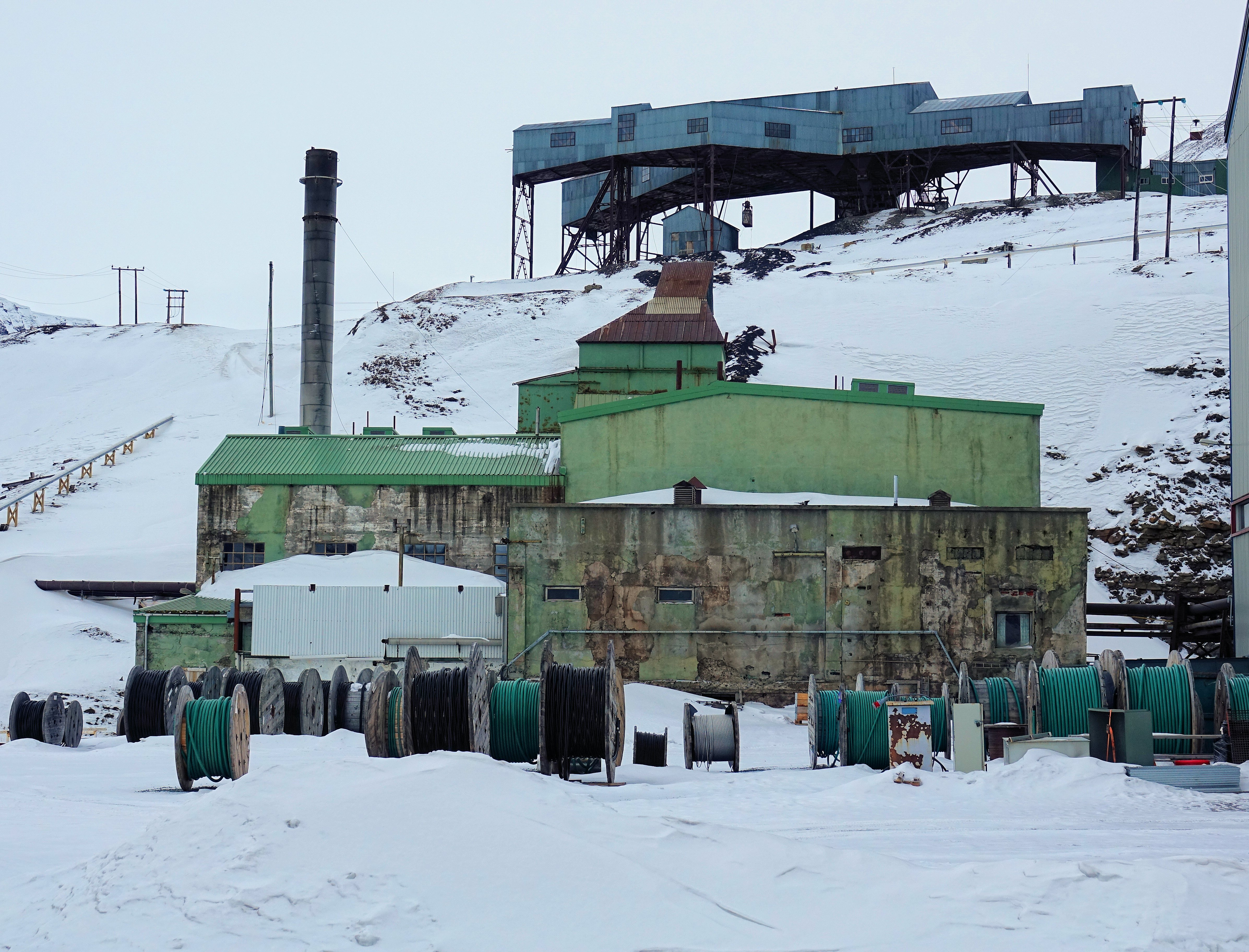
The old power station, one of a handful of buildings that survived the Second World War, and the cable centre

Plans were laid during the war to ensure a quick reconstruction and resumption of mining. By 1948, coal production had reached the pre-war level of 480,000 tonnes (470,000 long tons; 530,000 short tons) per year. Nybyen was established in 1946 and consisted of five barracks, each housing 72 people. The first issue of Svalbardposten was published in November 1948. Until then, various wall newspapers had been published irregularly. In 1949, Longyearbyen received a telephone connection with the mainland via a radio connection between Svalbard Radio and Harstad. In 1949, a farm was built in Longyearbyen to hold cattle (for milk), pigs, and hens. A local radio station started broadcasting in 1950. The burial ground remained in use until 1950, with 44 people buried. However, it was discovered that the bodies were failing to decompose because of the permafrost, and that they could be preserving various microorganisms. Bodies have since been sent to the mainland for burial. The community centre Huset opened in 1951.

Mining in Mine 1b was terminated in 1958, but operation in Mine 5 started the following year. Preliminary work on Mine 4 started in 1954, and from 1960 it was used as a reserve mine. The Norwegian Air Force started serving Longyearbyen with postal flights in the 1950s. In 1959, a man fell seriously ill, so a landing strip was prepared in Adventdalen. From the same year, Braathens SAFE started serving the tundra airport with irregular winter flights. In 1957, a principal was hired at the primary school and a new church was opened on 24 August 1958. From 1961, the primary school was supplemented by a private middle school. A branch of Tromsø Sparebank opened in 1959.

In the 1960s, the town's farm was closed and replaced by industrial liquefaction of powdered milk. The first serial-produced snowmobile was taken into use in 1961. By 1969, there were 140 registered snowmobiles and only 33 registered cars. From 1962 to 1984, a recreational centre was run at Sverdrupbyen. Ordinary operation in Mine 4 started in 1966 but was terminated by 1970, two years after Mine 2b closed. Operations in Mine 6 commenced in 1969. Television broadcasting equipment was installed in 1969, with the schedule of the Norwegian Broadcasting Corporation being aired with a two-week delay.

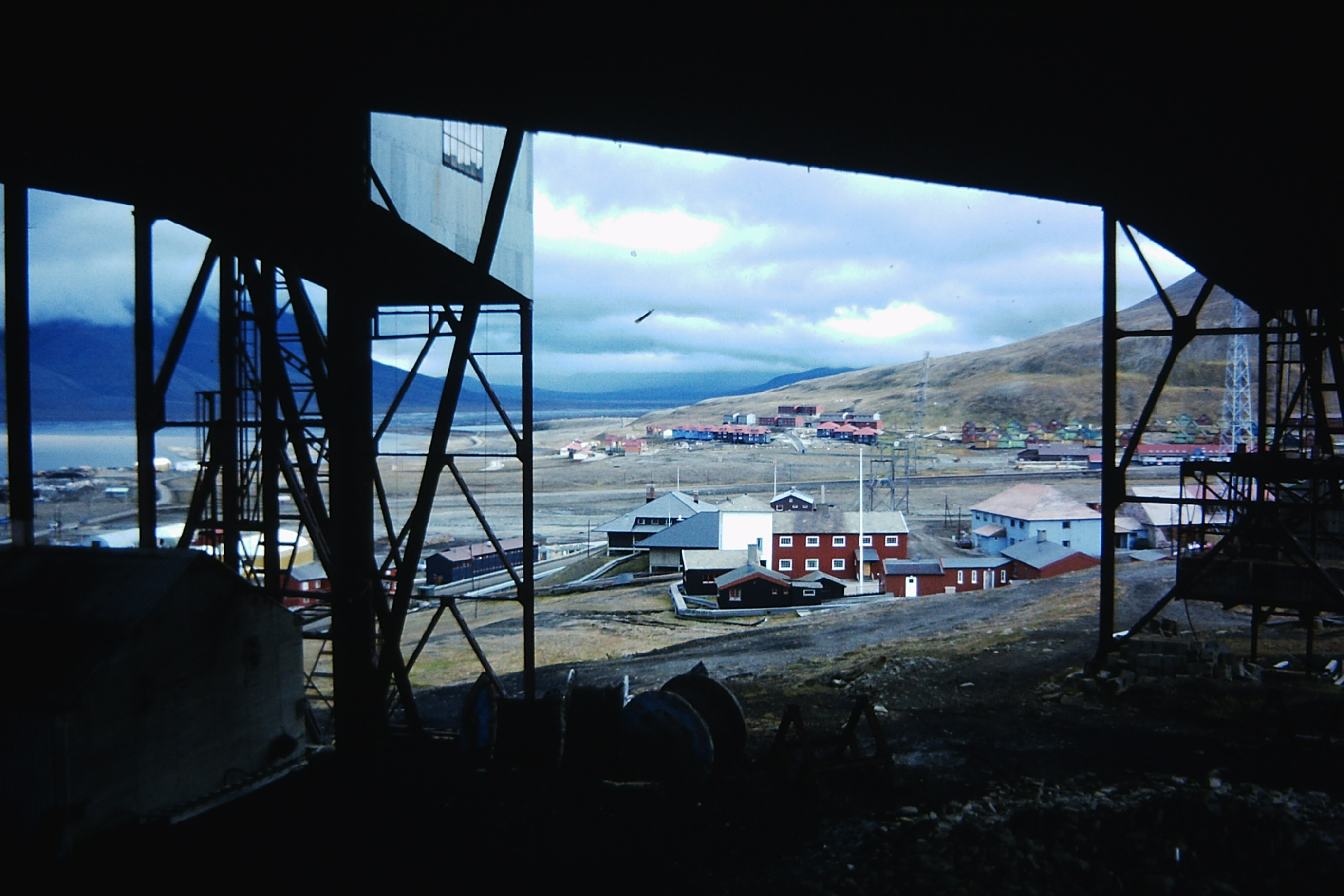
Longyearbyen in 1989, view from aerial tramway

In 1971, a new school building, with a combined primary and lower secondary school, was opened, along with a new gym and a 12.5-meter (41 ft) swimming pool. The Svalbard Council was established on 1 November 1971. It consisted of 17 non-partisan members who were elected or appointed in three different groups: SNSK employees, government employees and others, although the ratio changed several times. Operations of Mine 3 started in March 1971 and operations in Mine 7 commenced the following year. In 1973, the Ministry of Trade and Industry bought a third of SNSK. It continued buying additional shares until it reached a 99.94 per cent ownership in 1976. The airport was opened in 1975 and initially provided four weekly services to mainland Norway and semi-weekly services to Russia. In 1978, the community received satellite communications with the mainland. The same year, an upper secondary program was introduced at the public school. From 1984, television programmes were broadcast live via satellite.

Store Norske underwent a gradual change during the 1980s. Since 1980, Spitsbergen money has been taken out of circulation and replaced with ordinary Norwegian currency. Mine 6 closed the following year. From 1982, SNSK permitted private individuals to own and operate cars. By 1990, there were 353 registered cars and 883 snowscooters. On 1 July 1983, SNSK moved its head office from Bergen to Longyearbyen. Svalbard Samfunnsdrift (SSD), a limited company that was responsible for public infrastructure and services, was established by SNSK on 1 January 1989. Responsibilities included healthcare, the fire brigade, the kindergarten, roads, rubbish disposal, power production, the water and sewer system, the cinema, cultural activities and the library. Ownership was taken over by the Ministry of Trade and Industry on 1 January 1993.

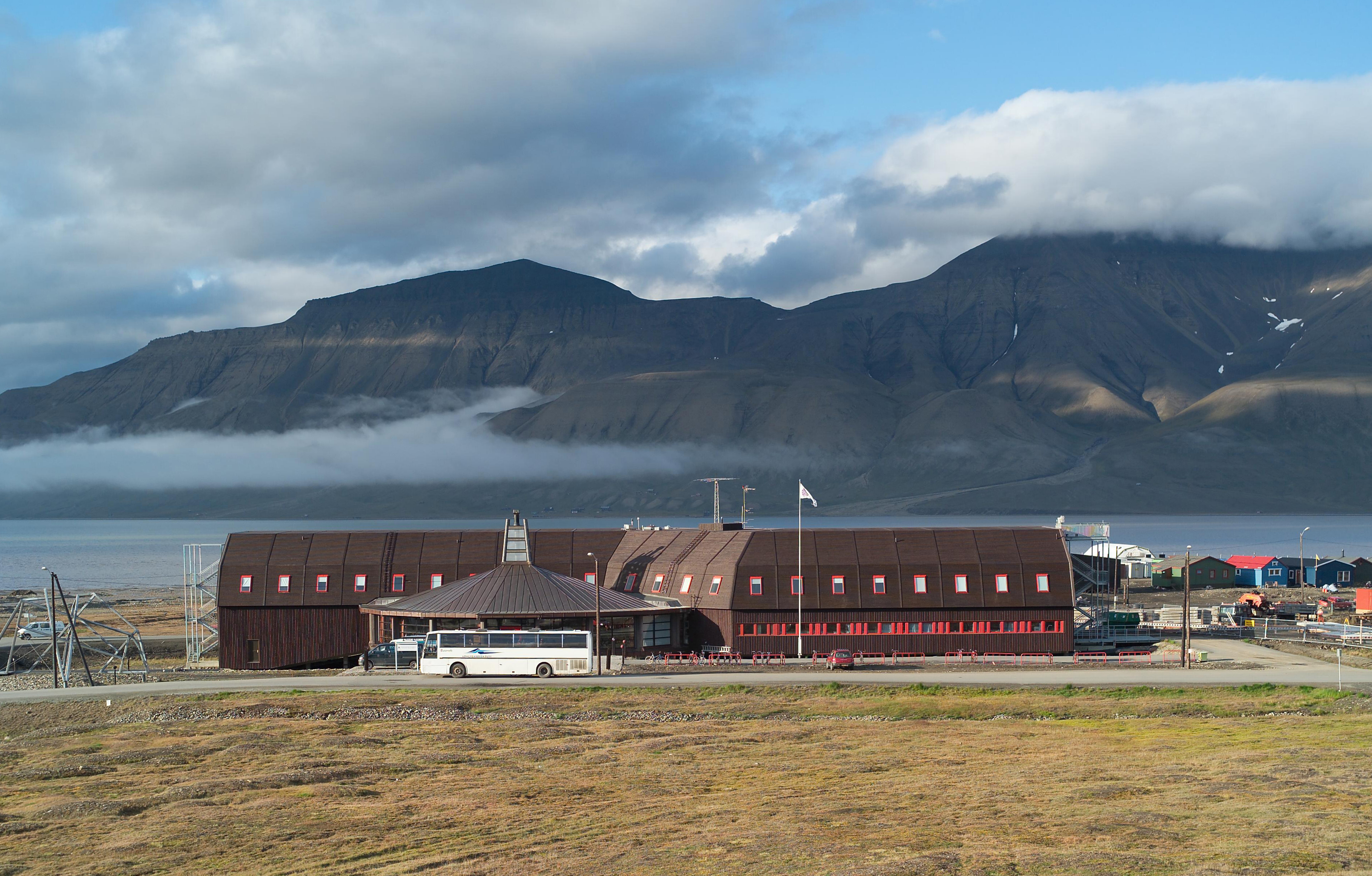
University Centre in Svalbard

During the 1990s, the authorities started a process to "normalise" Longyearbyen by abolishing the company town scheme and introducing a full range of services, a varied economy and local democracy. Commercial enterprises included a shopping mall replacing SNSK's provision store in 1992. Similarly, Esso opened a commercial fuel station in 1994. The Svalbard Council changed its regulations from 1993 and allowed parties to run for election. In a step to increase tourism, Svalbard Polar Hotel opened in 1995, and a year later mining of Mine 3 terminated. Longyearbyen Community Council was established in 2002, replacing the Svalbard Council and assimilating SSD, and took on many of the responsibilities and the structure of a municipality.

This period also saw the rise of a number of scientific establishments. The Agricultural University of Norway had established a primitive seed bank in 1984. The University Centre in Svalbard opened on 6 September 1993 and had 30 students in its inaugural semester. Telenor Mobil established GSM coverage in 1995, and in 2004 the Svalbard Undersea Cable System opened, providing fiber-optic cable connection to the mainland. The European Incoherent Scatter Scientific Association (EISCAT) opened a radar in 1996, followed by Svalbard Satellite Station in 1999 and the Svalbard Global Seed Vault in 2008.

=== 21st century ===
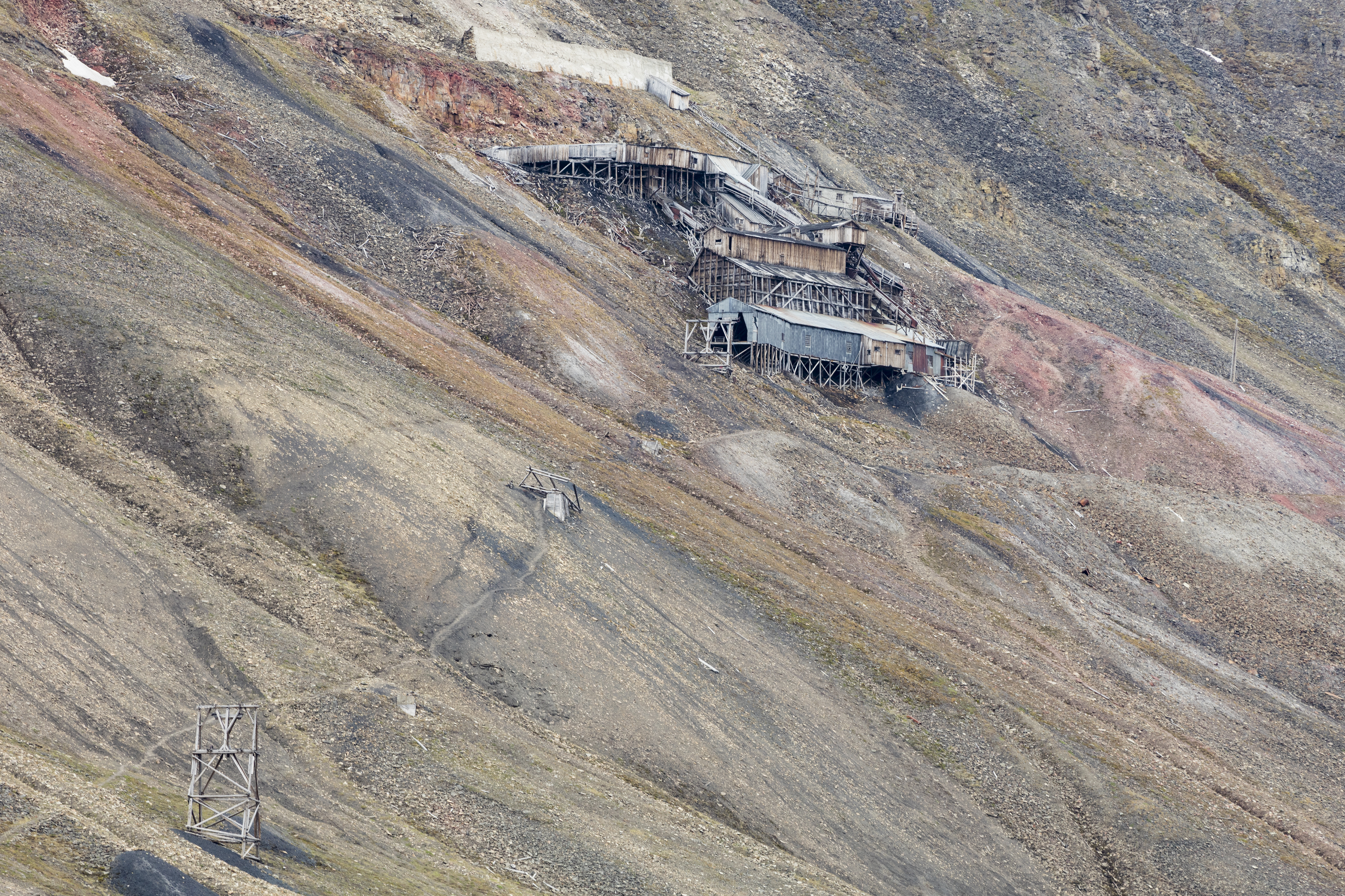
Mine 2b was mined from 1938 to 1969. Today, it is a heritage site.

The Norwegian side of Svalbard in January 2021 announced its plans to phase out all the coal mining activities on the island. On 30 June 2025 the Mine 7, the last Norwegian coal mine in Svalbard, was closed, though the Russian owned and operated mine in Barentsburg continued operation.

Following the 2022 Russian invasion into Ukraine, Longyearbyen and the Svalbard island became an important geopolitical location for Russia and NATO, due to the relative proximity of Svalbard to the Kola Peninsula, an important Russian port housing its nuclear-armed naval fleet, and its strategic location for Western intelligence, which potentially means it can become a target of Russia. In 2022 Russian trawlers were spotted as they severed an undersea communications cable that connected mainland Norway to Svalbard. In May 2025 Britain's foreign secretary, David Lammy, arrived in Svalbard to promote "close defence and intelligence ties with Norway and mutual efforts to track hostile activity in the Arctic".

== Geography ==
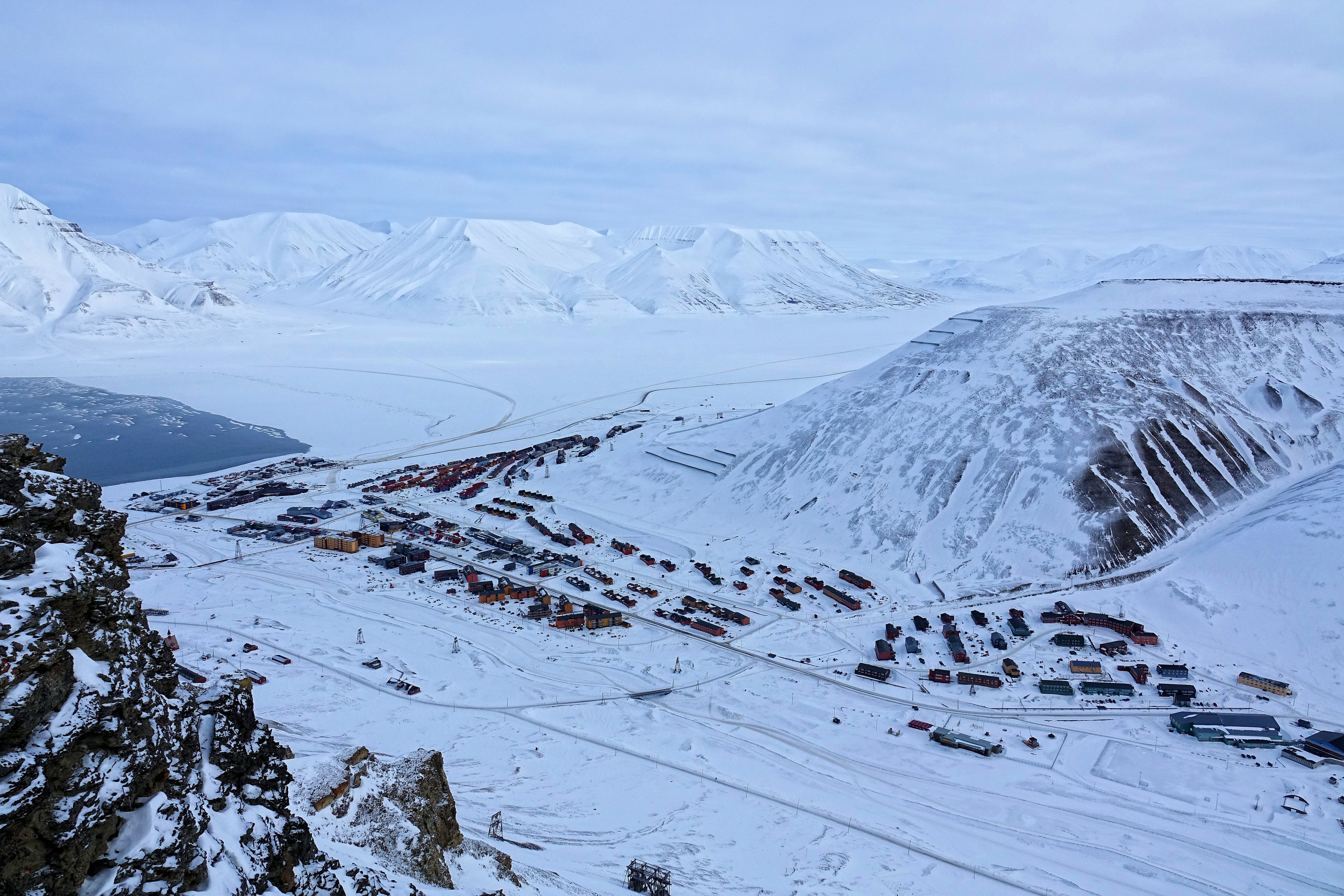
View of the central parts of Longyearbyen from Platåberget. The body of water is Adventfjorden while the valley up to the right is Adventdalen.

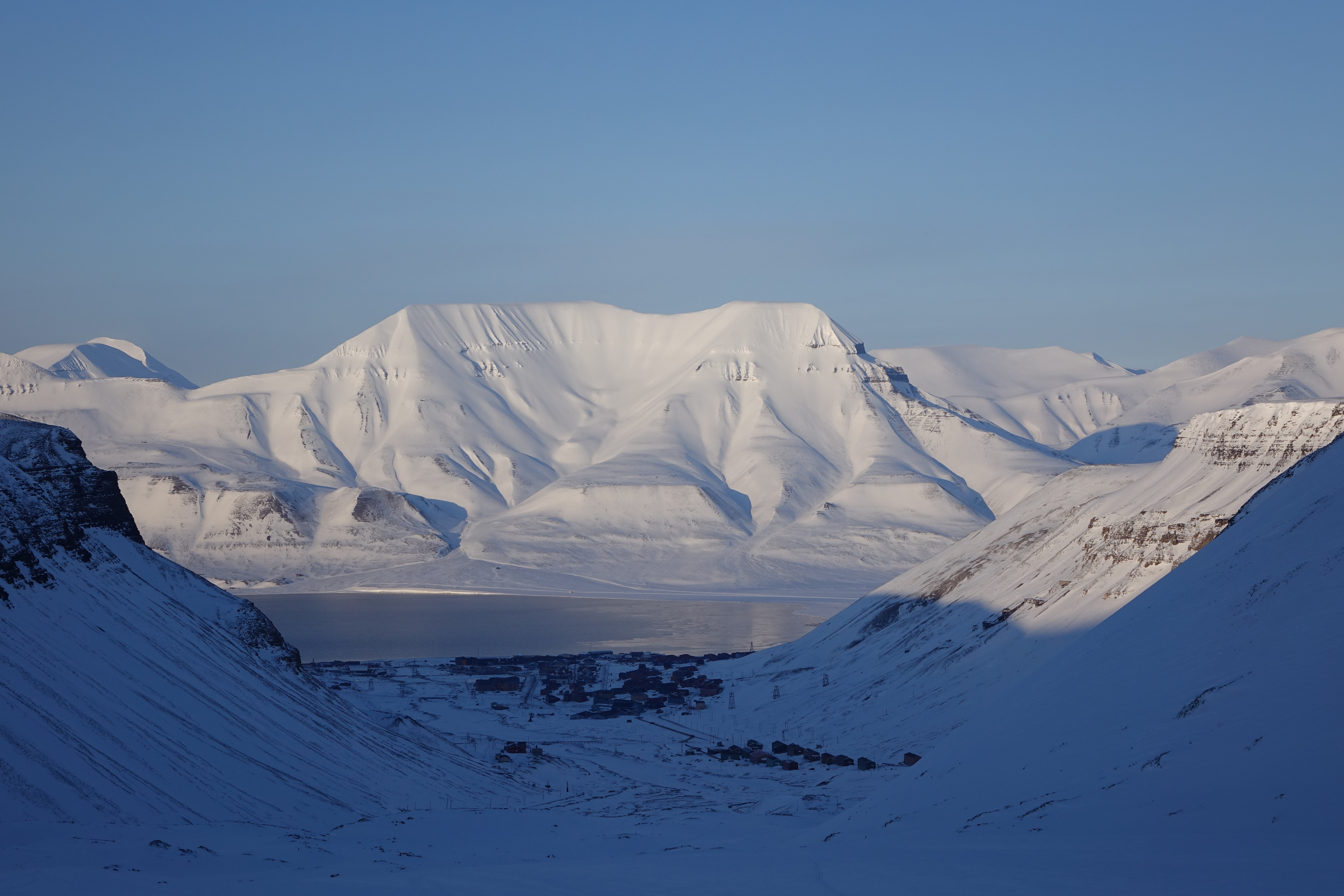
Longyearbyen seen from the top of the hill

Longyearbyen, despite being the part of the country Norway, is not part of the mainland Norway. It is in the lower portion of the Longyear Valley, along the Longyear River. The lower parts of the town lie along the southwestern shore of the bay of Adventfjorden, a 7-by-4-kilometre (4 1/2 by 2 1/2 mi) branch of Isfjorden. Longyearbyen is on the Nordenskiöld Land peninsula of Spitsbergen, the largest island of the Svalbard archipelago. Across the bay lie the ghost towns of Advent City and Hiorthhamn. It is the world's second northernmost town, with all settlements further north (excluding Ny-Ålesund) being research or meteorological outposts. The northernmost permanent settlement in the world is Alert, Canada, in the Qikiqtaaluk Region of Nunavut, while the true northernmost settlement in the world is Camp Barneo in April.

Longyearbyen is divided into several neighbourhoods. On the west side of the river, along the bay, lies the port and affiliated utility and industrial services. The western part of this area is called Bykaia and the eastern part Sjøområdet. Above lies Skjæringa, the site of the governor's offices. Slightly up the valley on the west side lies Gamle Longyearbyen ('Old Longyearbyen') and the church. Even further up lies the graveyard, then Huset and the cinema, and finally Sverdrupbyen. Most of the residential, commercial and cultural institutions are on the east side of the river. Along the bay the area is called Sjøskrenten. Further up lies the university centre and Gruvedalen, the largest residential area. Southwards from there is the main shopping area as well as the town hall. To the east is the residential area Lia and further up Haugen, which is also the location of the school. Furthest up in the valley is Mine 2b and Nybyen, which is mostly used as student housing. Westwards out of town towards Hotellneset is the airport and Mine 3. The remaining mines are in Adventdalen, to the east of town.

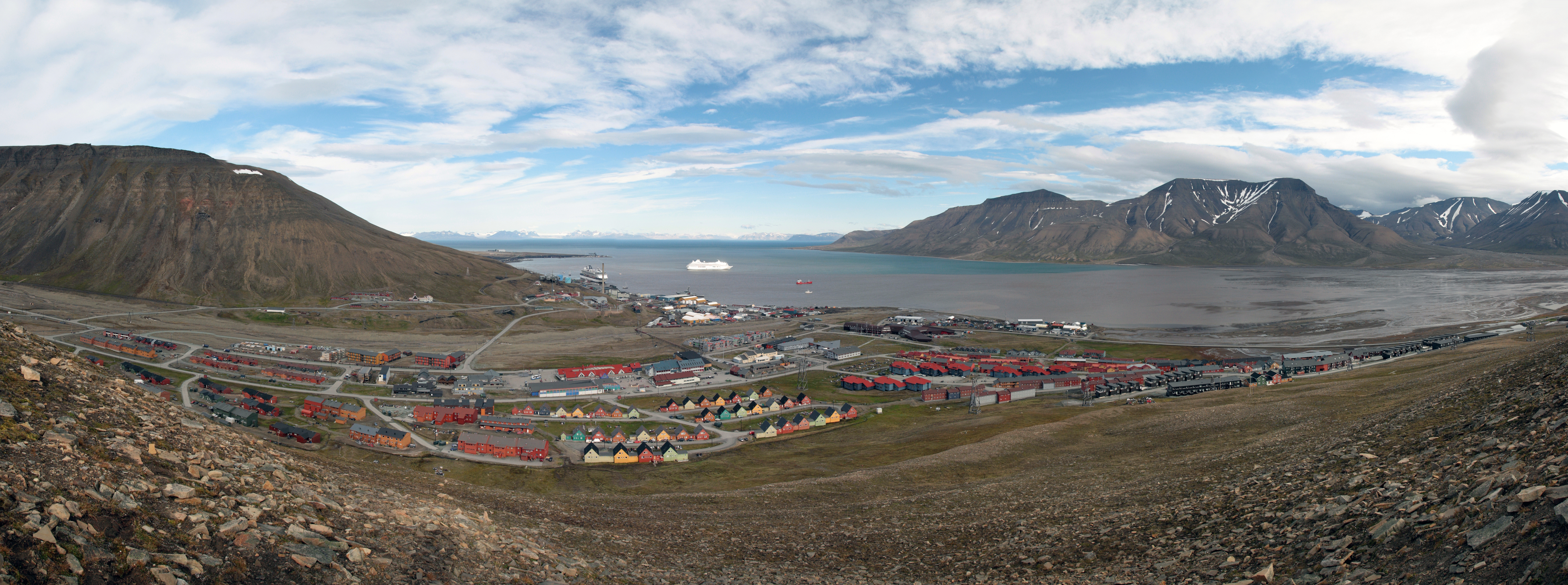
Longyearbyen in July

=== Climate ===
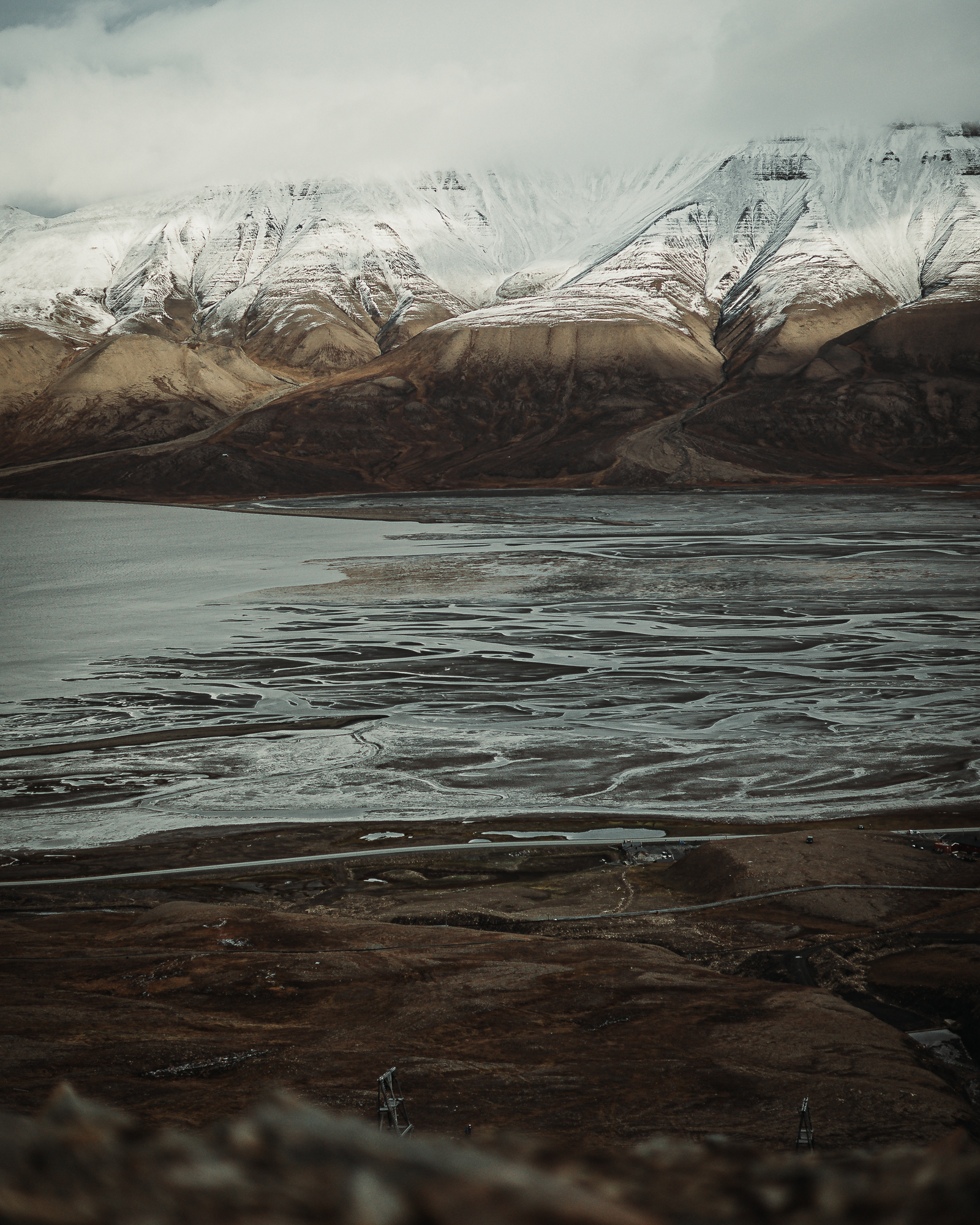
Longyearbyen outskirts

Longyearbyen has a polar tundra climate (Köppen: ET, Trewartha: Ftkc) tempered by the North Atlantic Current. The west coast of Svalbard is the warmest and wettest part of the archipelago (except for Bear Island). This is caused by the convergence of mild and humid air from the south and cold air from the north. Longyearbyen generally has lower humidity than other settlements within the Arctic Circle. Longyearbyen experiences midnight sun from 18 April to 24 August (128 days), polar night from 27 October to 15 February (111 days), and civil polar night from 13 November to 29 January. However, due to shading from mountains, the sun is not visible in Longyearbyen until around 8 March. Snow typically covers the town from November to March.

Although Alert, Canada, likely has a lower average UV index, Longyearbyen has the lowest recorded average UV index for any current or previously inhabited place on Earth. Between April and September, the UV index typically ranges from 1 to 2, with May, June, and July having the highest UV index of 2. All other months average at 0, giving Longyearbyen a mean UV index of 0.75 over 12 months.

=== Climate change ===
The warmest temperature ever recorded in Longyearbyen was 21.7 °C (71.1 °F) in July 2020 following 111 months of above-average heat and the coldest was −46.3 °C (−51.3 °F) in March 1986. Svalbard and Longyearbyen are among the places in the world that have warmed fastest in the latest decades. The 1991–2020 averages show that mean annual temperature in Longyearbyen has increased by 3.6 °C (6.5 °F) since 1961–1990. With the sea surface temperatures warming, ice formation takes longer in the surrounding waters and thus especially early winter under the polar night warms the fastest due to the shorter ice season.

As of 2021, Longyearbyen was the fastest-warming town in the world. Since 1971, temperatures on Svalbard have risen five times faster than the global average, by roughly 4 °C (7.2 °F). Winters in 2021 were more than 7 °C (13 °F) warmer than they were in the 1970s. According to the 2021 study by Norwegian Meteorological Institute, annual precipitation on Svalbard has increased by 30 to 45 per cent over the past 50 years, mostly in the form of winter rain. Since 2009, deep permafrost temperatures have increased at rates between 0.06 and 0.15 °C (0.11 and 0.27 °F) per year.

=== Water supply ===
The town's drinking water comes from a dammed lake called Isdammen. In September 2025, its manganese levels were found to be elevated. It has been leaching out of bedrock pyrite, because of thawing permafrost. As an emergency measure, water was purified by a brewery and distributed to residents. In 2026, sulphate and nickel levels were elevated. Since the problem is not going to go away, filtration or desalination are being considered.

Climate data for Svalbard Airport Longyearbyen 1991–2020 (28 m, extremes 1975–2022)
Month	Jan	Feb	Mar	Apr	May	Jun	Jul	Aug	Sep	Oct	Nov	Dec	Year
Record high °C (°F)	7.7 (45.9)	7.0 (44.6)	6.3 (43.3)	7.5 (45.5)	12.9 (55.2)	15.7 (60.3)	21.7 (71.1)	20.3 (68.5)	15.2 (59.4)	10.1 (50.2)	9.2 (48.6)	8.7 (47.7)	21.7 (71.1)
Mean daily maximum °C (°F)	−7.7 (18.1)	−8.3 (17.1)	−8.8 (16.2)	−5.7 (21.7)	−0.6 (30.9)	5.6 (42.1)	9.4 (48.9)	8.2 (46.8)	4.0 (39.2)	−1.5 (29.3)	−3.8 (25.2)	−6.1 (21.0)	−1.3 (29.7)
Daily mean °C (°F)	−10.9 (12.4)	−11.6 (11.1)	−12.0 (10.4)	−8.8 (16.2)	−2.2 (28.0)	3.6 (38.5)	7.0 (44.6)	6.0 (42.8)	2.0 (35.6)	−3.8 (25.2)	−6.4 (20.5)	−9.2 (15.4)	−3.9 (25.1)
Mean daily minimum °C (°F)	−14.2 (6.4)	−15.0 (5.0)	−15.5 (4.1)	−12.1 (10.2)	−3.9 (25.0)	2.2 (36.0)	5.4 (41.7)	4.4 (39.9)	0.3 (32.5)	−6.1 (21.0)	−9.3 (15.3)	−12.2 (10.0)	−6.3 (20.6)
Record low °C (°F)	−38.8 (−37.8)	−43.7 (−46.7)	−46.3 (−51.3)	−39.1 (−38.4)	−21.7 (−7.1)	−8.4 (16.9)	−0.7 (30.7)	−3.9 (25.0)	−12.6 (9.3)	−20.8 (−5.4)	−33.2 (−27.8)	−35.6 (−32.1)	−46.3 (−51.3)
Average precipitation mm (inches)	21 (0.8)	17 (0.7)	16 (0.6)	9 (0.4)	8 (0.3)	8 (0.3)	20 (0.8)	23 (0.9)	26 (1.0)	18 (0.7)	22 (0.9)	24 (0.9)	212 (8.3)
Source 1: Norwegian Meteorological Institute
Source 2: Meteostat

Climate data for Longyearbyen (1961–1990)
Month	Jan	Feb	Mar	Apr	May	Jun	Jul	Aug	Sep	Oct	Nov	Dec	Year
Record high °C (°F)	9.7 (49.5)	7.0 (44.6)	6.3 (43.3)	7.5 (45.5)	10.6 (51.1)	15.7 (60.3)	21.7 (71.1)	18.1 (64.6)	15.2 (59.4)	8.9 (48.0)	7.5 (45.5)	8.7 (47.7)	21.7 (71.1)
Mean daily maximum °C (°F)	−13.0 (8.6)	−13.0 (8.6)	−13.0 (8.6)	−9.0 (15.8)	−3.0 (26.6)	3.0 (37.4)	7.0 (44.6)	6.0 (42.8)	1.0 (33.8)	−4.0 (24.8)	−8.0 (17.6)	−11.0 (12.2)	−4.7 (23.5)
Daily mean °C (°F)	−16.5 (2.3)	−17.0 (1.4)	−16.5 (2.3)	−12.5 (9.5)	−5.0 (23.0)	1.0 (33.8)	5.0 (41.0)	4.0 (39.2)	−1.0 (30.2)	−6.5 (20.3)	−11.0 (12.2)	−14.5 (5.9)	−7.5 (18.4)
Mean daily minimum °C (°F)	−20.0 (−4.0)	−21.0 (−5.8)	−20.0 (−4.0)	−16.0 (3.2)	−7.0 (19.4)	−1.0 (30.2)	3.0 (37.4)	2.0 (35.6)	−3.0 (26.6)	−9.0 (15.8)	−14.0 (6.8)	−18.0 (−0.4)	−10.3 (13.4)
Record low °C (°F)	−38.8 (−37.8)	−43.7 (−46.7)	−46.3 (−51.3)	−39.1 (−38.4)	−21.7 (−7.1)	−8.4 (16.9)	0.2 (32.4)	−3.9 (25.0)	−12.6 (9.3)	−20.8 (−5.4)	−33.2 (−27.8)	−35.6 (−32.1)	−46.3 (−51.3)
Average precipitation mm (inches)	22.0 (0.87)	28.0 (1.10)	29.0 (1.14)	16.0 (0.63)	13.0 (0.51)	18.0 (0.71)	24.0 (0.94)	30.0 (1.18)	25.0 (0.98)	19.0 (0.75)	22.0 (0.87)	25.0 (0.98)	271 (10.66)
Average rainy days (≥ 1 mm)	2	2	2	3	4	13	17	18	14	5	3	3	86
Average snowy days (≥ 1 cm)	21	17	19	17	16	7	1	2	11	21	22	22	176
Mean monthly sunshine hours	0.0	0.0	77.5	228.0	254.2	165.0	155.0	133.3	75.0	12.4	0.0	0.0	1,102
Percentage possible sunshine	0.0	0.0	22.1	36.4	34.2	22.9	20.8	18.7	17.4	6.2	0.0	0.0	25
Average ultraviolet index	0	0	0	1	2	2	2	1	1	0	0	0	0.75
Source 1: nordicvisitor.com
Source 2: UNIS (extremes only) (sun only) and Weather Atlas (UV index)

== Demographics ==
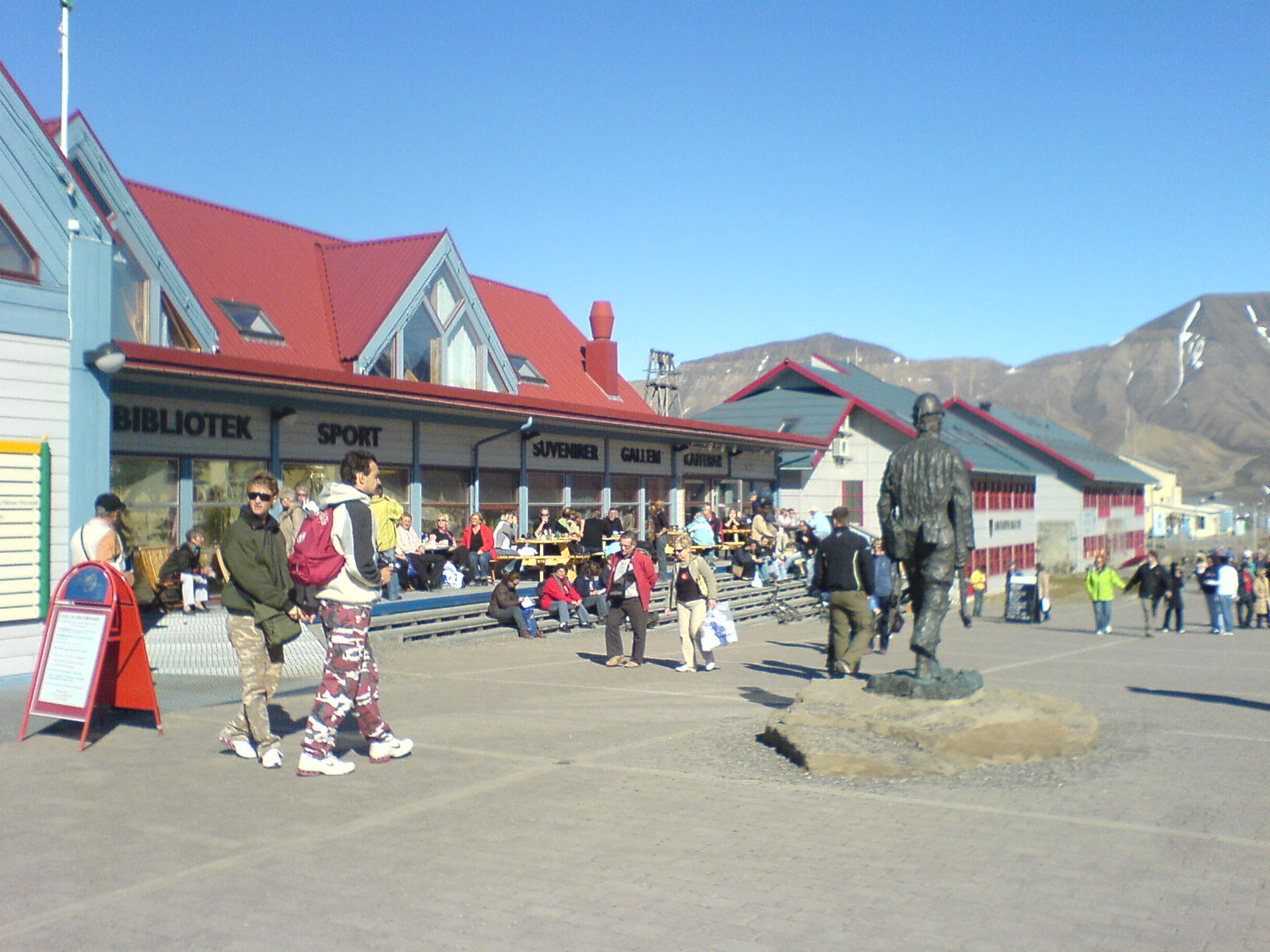
Tourists visit the main street, with a shopping mall closest and the town hall further down.

On 31 August 2020, the Longyearbyen Tax Office registered 2,354 people as residents. The majority regional group were Norwegians, amassing into 64.5%, with the rest hailing from 53 countries outside Norway. The three biggest national minorities were Thai (137 people, 9%), Swedes (108 people, 7%) and Filipinos (100 people, 7%). As of 2009, roughly 300 people (16%) were non-Norwegian citizens, with the largest nationalities being from Thailand, Sweden, Russia, Philippines, and Ukraine. In 2012, the majority of Norwegians were originally from Northern Norway, particularly Nordland and Troms, and made up more than 40% of the population.

In 2014, Thai people numbered at 120 and were the second largest group of residents after Norwegians; there were 60 in 2006. Thais first came to Svalbard when men brought their wives from Thailand during the 1970s. In 2006, most of the Thai residents worked as cleaners. In 2007, ten students at the Longyearbyen School were Thai. The Thai community is active in numerous cultural events annually and motivated the establishment of a Thai supermarket.

Because of the dominance of the mining industry, the 2012 gender distribution was skewed, with 60% of adults being males. Longyearbyen has an over-average share of its population between 25 and 44 years old, but nearly no residents over 66. The number of children in relation to the population is at the national average, but Longyearbyen has significantly fewer teenagers than the national average. In 2022, the population was very young, with about half of the people aged 20–44, about 400 children and only few elderly.

Longyearbyen experiences a high population mobility. In 2008, 427 people (23%) moved away from the town. The average person lived in Longyearbyen for 6.3 years: 6.6 years for Norwegians and 4.3 years for foreigners. In 2009, about a quarter of the population had lived in the town since before 2000, and can thus be regarded as its permanent population. The longest-residing people tend to work in the mining industry, followed by local government employees. The shortest tenures are held by students and employees in higher education, tourism and the state. The turnover has created what the Norwegian government calls a "revolving door society". Most young newcomers leave within seven years, a turnover rate far greater than in any municipality on the mainland. As of 2022, 43% of residents stayed less than two years and 64% stayed less than five years.

In total, 70% of households consist of a single person compared to 41% on the mainland, giving an average 1.6 people per household. The difference is largely caused by people working on Svalbard while their family remains on the mainland. Longyearbyen's population is more highly educated than the national average—54% compared to 43% have upper secondary education and 30% compared to 26% have tertiary education. Among women, 40% have higher education.

== Politics and government ==
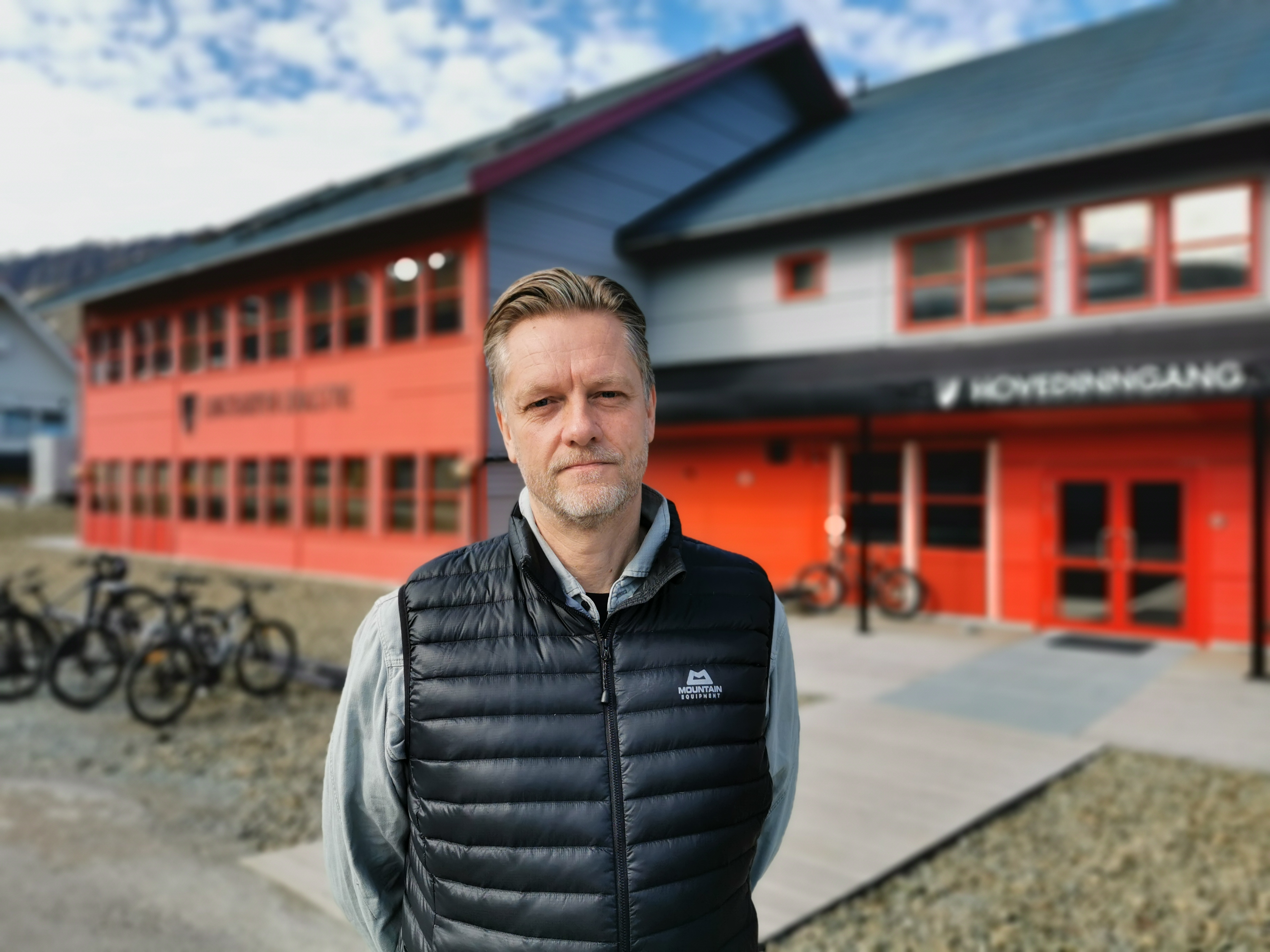
Leif Terje Aunevik, mayor of Longyearbyen (2024)

Longyearbyen Community Council has many of the same responsibilities as a municipality. It is organised with a 15-member council that since 2015 has been led by Mayor Arild Olsen of the Labour Party. The council's main responsibilities are infrastructure and utilities, including power, land-use and community planning, education from kindergarten to upper secondary level and child welfare. It operates three kindergartens in addition to the 13-grade Longyearbyen School.

Foreigners do not need a visa, work permit, or residence permit to stay there, due to Svalbard being outside of the Schengen Area.

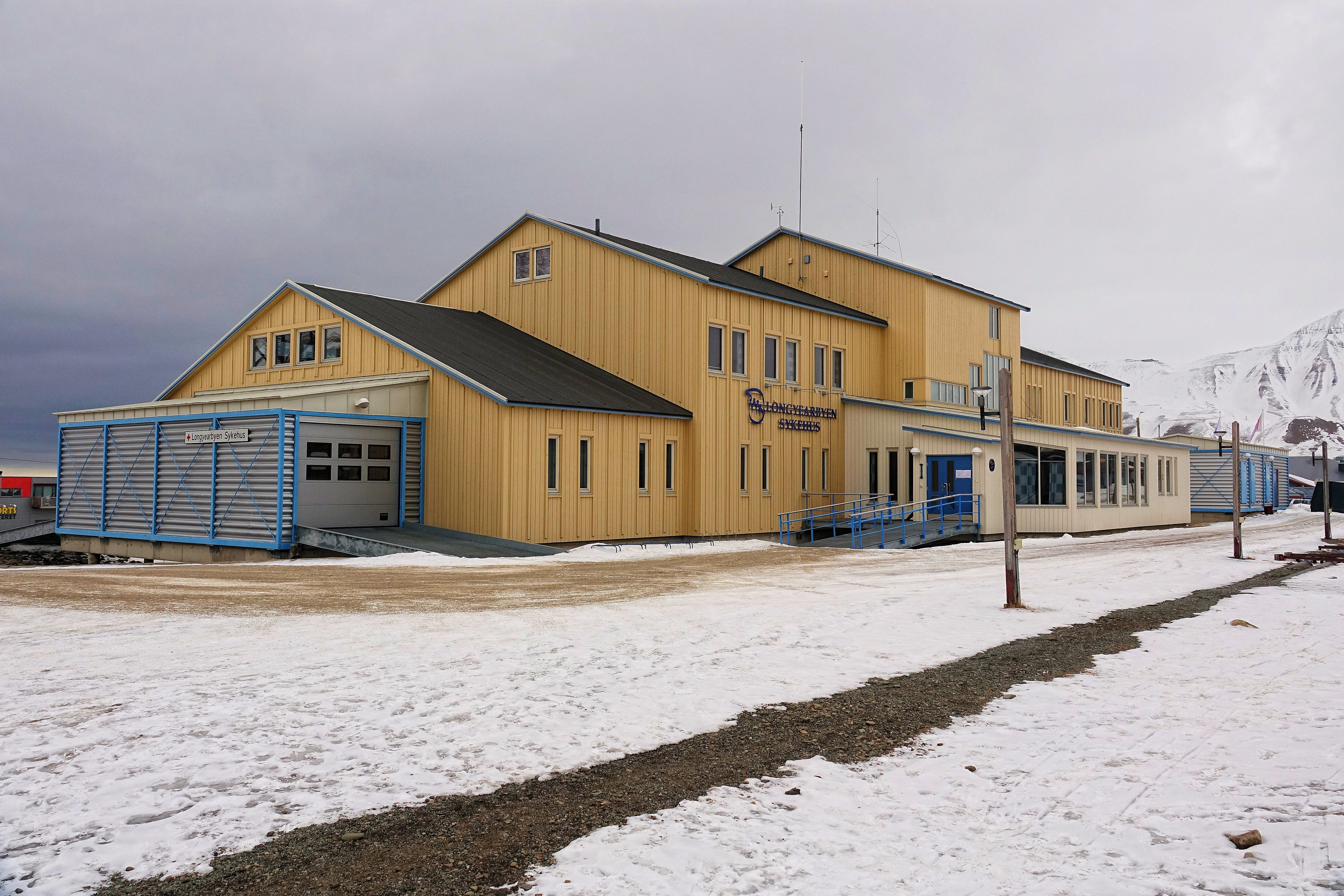
Longyearbyen hospital

No care or nursing services and welfare payments are available. Norwegian residents retain pension and medical rights through their mainland municipalities. The University Hospital of North Norway operates a clinic, Longyearbyen Hospital. Other public offices with a presence on Longyearbyen are the Norwegian Directorate of Mining, the Norwegian Polar Institute, the Norwegian Tax Administration and the Church of Norway. Longyearbyen is subordinate to Nord-Troms District Court and Hålogaland Court of Appeal, both in Tromsø.

The Svalbard Treaty of 1920 established full Norwegian sovereignty over the archipelago. The treaty came into effect in 1925, following the Svalbard Act that established the institution of the Governor of Svalbard. The governor holds responsibility as both county governor and chief of police, as well as holding other authority granted from the executive branch. Duties include environmental policy, family law, law enforcement, search and rescue, tourism management, information services, contact with foreign settlements and judge in some areas of maritime inquiries and judicial examinations—albeit never in the same cases as acting as police. Kjerstin Askholt has been governor since 2015; she is assisted by a staff of 26 professionals. The institution is subordinate to the Ministry of Justice and the Police, but reports to other ministries in matters within their portfolio.

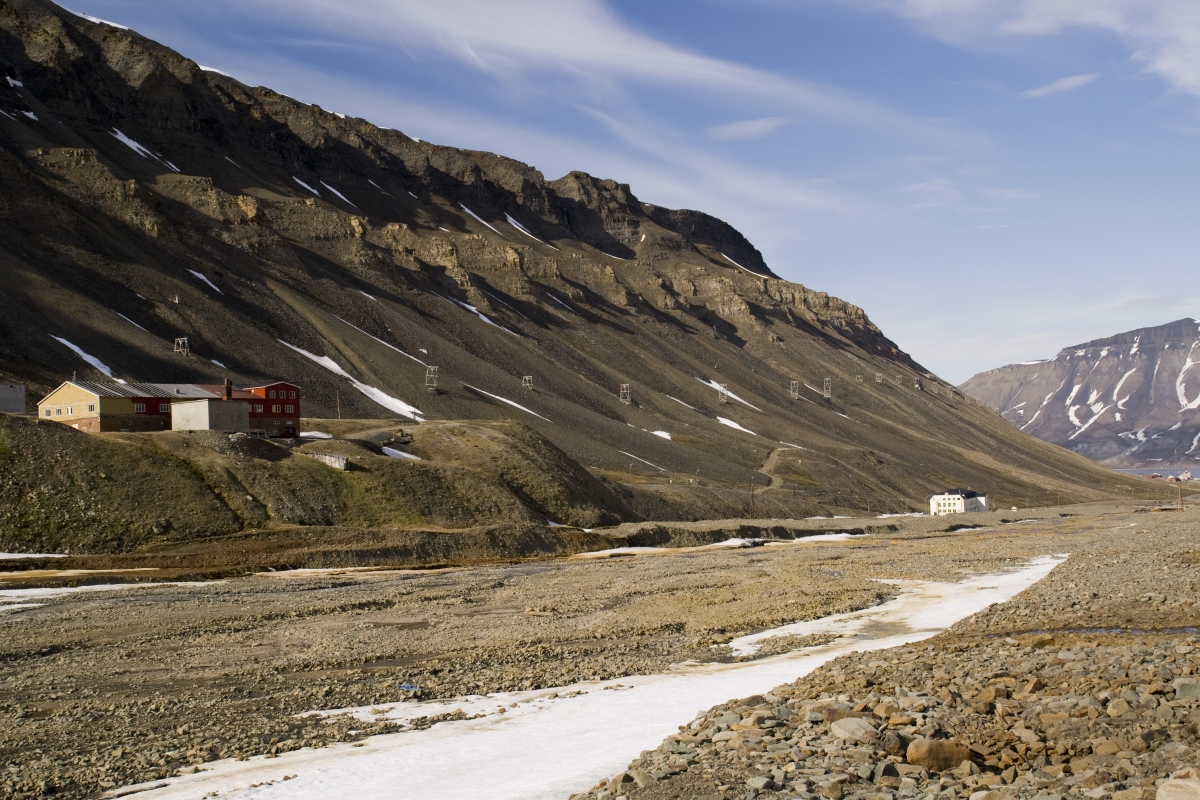
Upper part of the Longyear Valley, with the buildings of Sverdrupbyen to the left, Huset to the right and an aerial tramway in the background

Because of the special treaty status of Svalbard, Longyearbyen is subject to Norwegian legislation, but citizens of any signatory country may conduct commercial activities and live in town. However, people without a source of income can be rejected by the governor. The treaty limits Norway's right to collect taxes to that of financing services on Svalbard. Therefore, Longyearbyen has a lower income tax than mainland Norway, and there is no value added tax. The treaty has resulted in Longyearbyen being a demilitarized zone and it is not part of the European Economic Area nor of the Schengen Area like the rest of Norway.

Starting with the 2023 Norwegian local elections, voters for the Longyearbyen community council must have previously resided in mainland Norway for at least three years. Previously, foreign citizens who had lived in Longyearbyen itself for three years had also been allowed to vote, with the rule change disenfranchising a significant percentage of the settlement's population.

=== Unique laws ===
Due to its remoteness, Longyearbyen has laws that are found in few, if any, other places in the world. Notable examples of such laws include regulations prohibiting the import of most live mammals and birds, a restriction on the amount of alcohol an individual can purchase each month, and a recommendation to anyone venturing outside to carry a rifle for protection against polar bears. While it is popularly claimed that it is illegal to die in Longyearbyen, the wording of this claim is misleading. While it is not actually illegal to die in the town, there are no options for burial of bodies there (ashes can be buried with permission from the government) and residents considered terminally ill are typically required to move to the mainland. The decision to disallow burials came in 1950, when it was discovered that the bodies of residents who had died as a result of the 1918 flu pandemic had not begun to decompose. Today, scientists are concerned that these corpses, preserved by permafrost, may still harbor live strains of the virus responsible for killing between 1% and 6% of the world's population during the early 20th century.

== Recreation, culture and tourism ==
Svalbard Church of the Church of Norway has the entire archipelago as its parish. The congregational hall is 126 m^{2} (1,360 sq ft) while the sitting room is 112 m^{2} (1,210 sq ft). The church is built in half-timber.

There are two museums in town, Svalbard Museum and the Spitsbergen Airship Museum.

The community council runs a number of cultural activities, such as a cinema, a youth club, a library, and a gallery.

Solfestuka ('Sun Festival Week') takes place each year during the week surrounding 8 March, the date sunlight is first visible in most of the town after the polar night that began the previous October (the first official sunrise is usually 16 February, but most of the town is still in shadow due to the surrounding mountains). Dark Season Blues has been held annually in October since 2003. Polarjazz has been held in late January/early February since 1998.

The Arctic Film Festival is held annually in the city's screening venue, Kulturhuset.

An abandoned coal mine near Longyearbyen contains a steel vault constructed by Piql, a Norwegian data-storage company, alongside Store Norske Spitsbergen Kulkompani as a part of the Arctic World Archive project. The vault stores data of historical and cultural interest from several countries, as well as all of American multinational company GitHub's open source code. It was opened on 27 March 2017.

The town houses Svalbard Bryggeri, the northernmost commercial brewery in the world. Huset Restaurant, housed in the historic Huset community centre building since 2022, is known for its fine cuisine, run by Spanish chef Alberto Lozano.

=== Sports ===
The town's sole known organised sports club is Svalbard Turn. Svalbardhallen is an indoor sport centre that includes a multi-sport hall large enough for handball or three badminton courts, a shooting range, a climbing wall and a 25-metre (82 ft) swimming pool.

The town has no outdoor sports fields, and there are no known cases of a senior team in any indoor or outdoor sport participating in a national Norwegian competition (e.g. Norwegian Cup). An under-16 boys futsal team, representing Svalbard Turn, played in the small 2-day Per Bredesen Cup in Horten in March 2020.

Svalbard Turn hosts the Spitsbergen Marathon and the Svalbard Skimaraton (42 kilometres or 26 miles freestyle, though many participants use classic style).

Since 2011, there has been a club of supporters for the English Premier League football team, Liverpool, called the "Liverbirds Svalbard".

== Media ==
Svalbardposten is a weekly newspaper published on Friday. Printing takes place in Tromsø and the majority of subscribers live on the mainland. Icepeople, an alternative newspaper in English, is also published weekly.

For television, an edited feed of NRK1 began airing in 1969 on a 2-week delay; the broadcasts did not accomplish live broadcasting until 22 December 1984, which in turn resulted in Svalbard being added to the national newscasts' weather reports. Allente pay-TV satellite signals have effectively been receivable since the Canal Digital signals became publicly available in mainland Norway.

NRK P1 (most likely the Troms and Finnmark opt-out), P4 (Norway), and Radio Norge have been available. As of July 2020, the Skjæringa mast was the only known remaining medium wave AM (or any AM range) broadcaster of an NRK station. DAB radio broadcasting began in August or September 2016, followed by FM radio shutting down in December 2017. Only the NRK DAB network with 13 stations was planned to be set up as of February 2016.

Fiber broadband is provided by the Svalbard Undersea Cable System.

== Economy ==
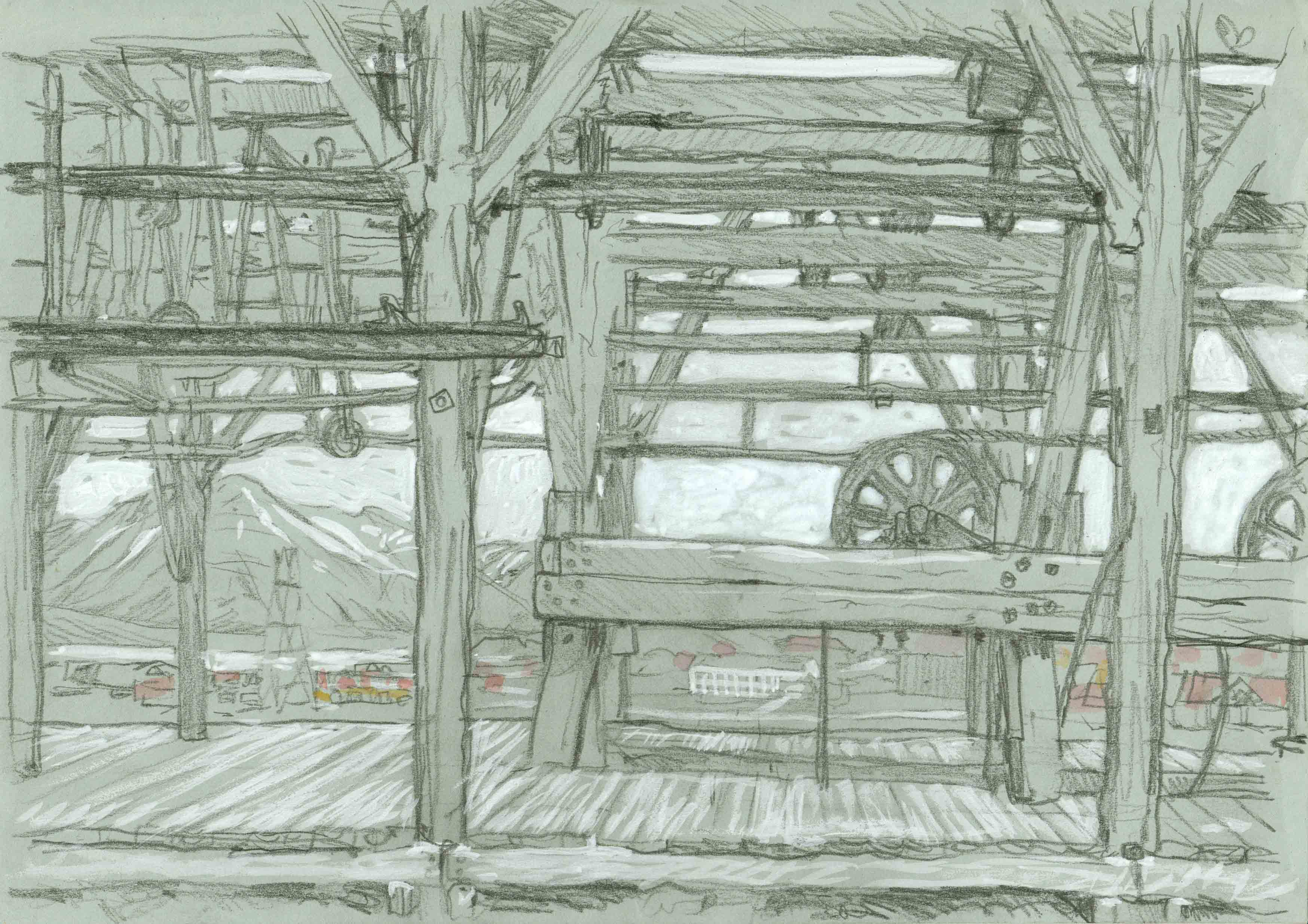
Old coal filling station. Drawing by Max Presnyakov, 2014.

=== Coal mining ===
Coal mining started in 1906 and production peaked in 2007 at 4.1 million tonnes, and decreased to 1.1 million tonnes in 2015. The only mining still taking place in Longyearbyen is at Mine 7, 15 kilometers (9 mi) up Adventdalen. In 2012 it produced 70,000 tonnes (69,000 long tons; 77,000 short tons) of coal annually, of which 25,000 tonnes (25,000 long tons; 28,000 short tons) is used to fuel Longyear Power Station, Norway's only coal-fueled power station. The power station was scheduled for a NOK 60 million maintenance work, and the local authorities decided a NOK 40 million upgrade of the diesel power plant instead.

Most of Store Norske's coal production was done at Sveagruva, on Van Mijenfjorden, 60 kilometers (37 mi) south of Longyearbyen. No roads connect the communities; instead, workers lived in dormitories in Svea until it closed in 2017. Seventy per cent commute home to the mainland while thirty per cent commute to Longyearbyen. Mining has not been profitable and Store Norske relies on state subsidies to retain production.

=== Fishing ===
Svalbard fisheries have witnessed an unforeseen consequence of global warming: Atlantic cod, mackerel, and snow crabs, fleeing warmer waters to the south, are heading north to Svalbard, swelling the local catch. In the decade of the 2020s, Norway values its Svalbard fishing trade at about US$94 million annually.

=== Tourism ===
Longyearbyen is the centre of tourism on the archipelago, although most tourism is generated based on natural experiences rather than visiting the town itself. However, Longyearbyen does provide supplies (including Svalbardbutikken, the area's only grocery store), accommodation and several museums. In 2008, Longyearbyen experienced 89,000 guest-nights, up from 30,000 in 1995. The average guest stayed 2.2 nights and 60 per cent of the capacity was used by tourists. About 40,000 tourists flew into Longyearbyen. Two-thirds of the tourists come from Norway. In 2007, the tourism industry had a revenue of NOK 291 million and produced 200-man-years. The Svalbard society received NOK 380 million in public funding in 2008, which increased to 650 million in 2015.

=== Services ===
The University Centre in Svalbard (UNIS) employs a permanent faculty of 40 professors and assistants and 120 guest lecturers for 350 students. UNIS does not offer degrees, but instead offers semester courses in biology, physics and geology. Student housing is at Nybyen. The college is part of the 12,000 m^{2} (130,000 sq ft) Svalbard Science Centre, which also features the Norwegian Polar Institute, EISCAT and Svalbard Science Forum. In 2006, about 9,000 research days were spent in Longyearbyen, most of which were by Norwegians. This made Longyearbyen the second-largest research outpost on Svalbard, marginally below Ny-Ålesund. In contrast, Longyearbyen has almost only Norwegian research, while Ny-Ålesund is roughly evenly split between Norwegian and foreign.

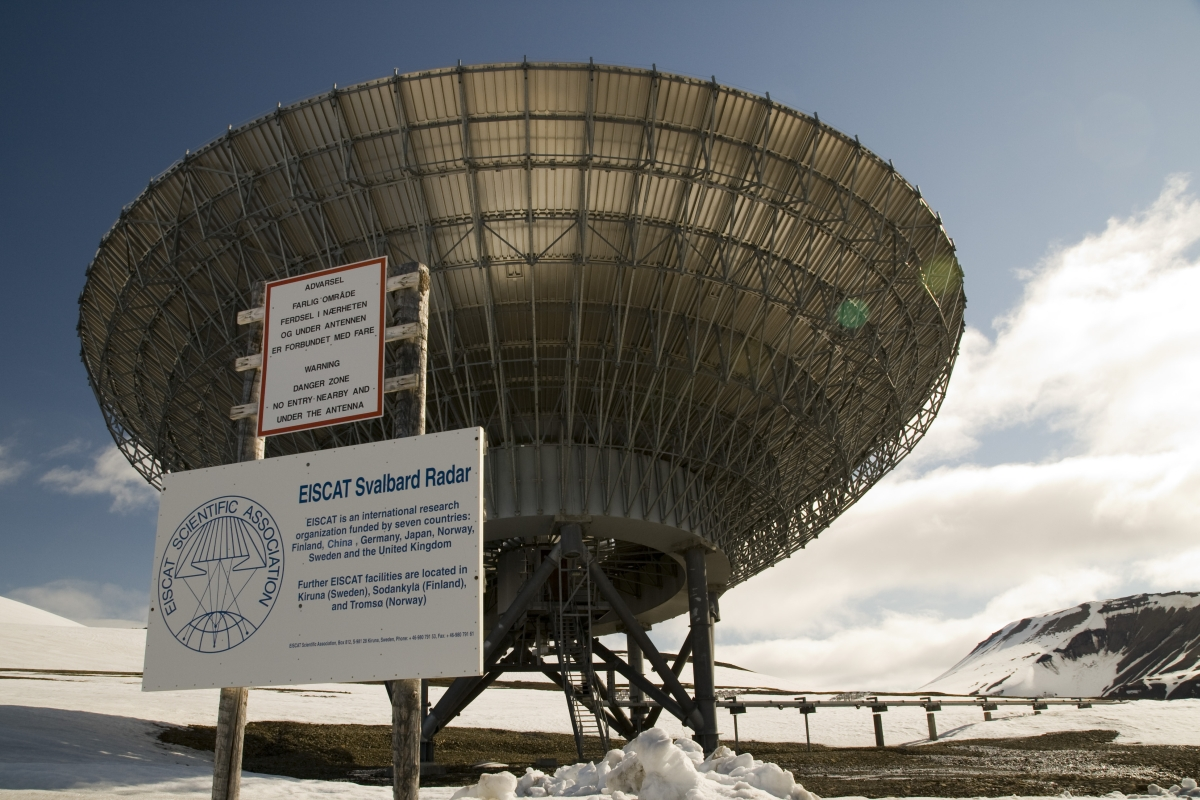
The EISCAT radar

Svalbard Satellite Station was built because of Longyearbyen's excellent location to download data from satellites in polar orbit. At Platåberget above Hotellneset, it was built as a cooperation between NASA and the Norwegian Space Centre, but has since 2001 been operated by Kongsberg Satellite Services. EISCAT operates an incoherent scatter radar to study the northern lights.

The Svalbard Global Seed Vault, administered by the Global Crop Diversity Trust, is a secure underground facility capable of storing millions of crop seeds. The facility has been designed to protect against natural and human disasters, including global warming, floods and fires and nuclear holocaust. The site was chosen for a number of factors including its remoteness, sound geology and the ambient temperature of the permafrost.

== Education ==
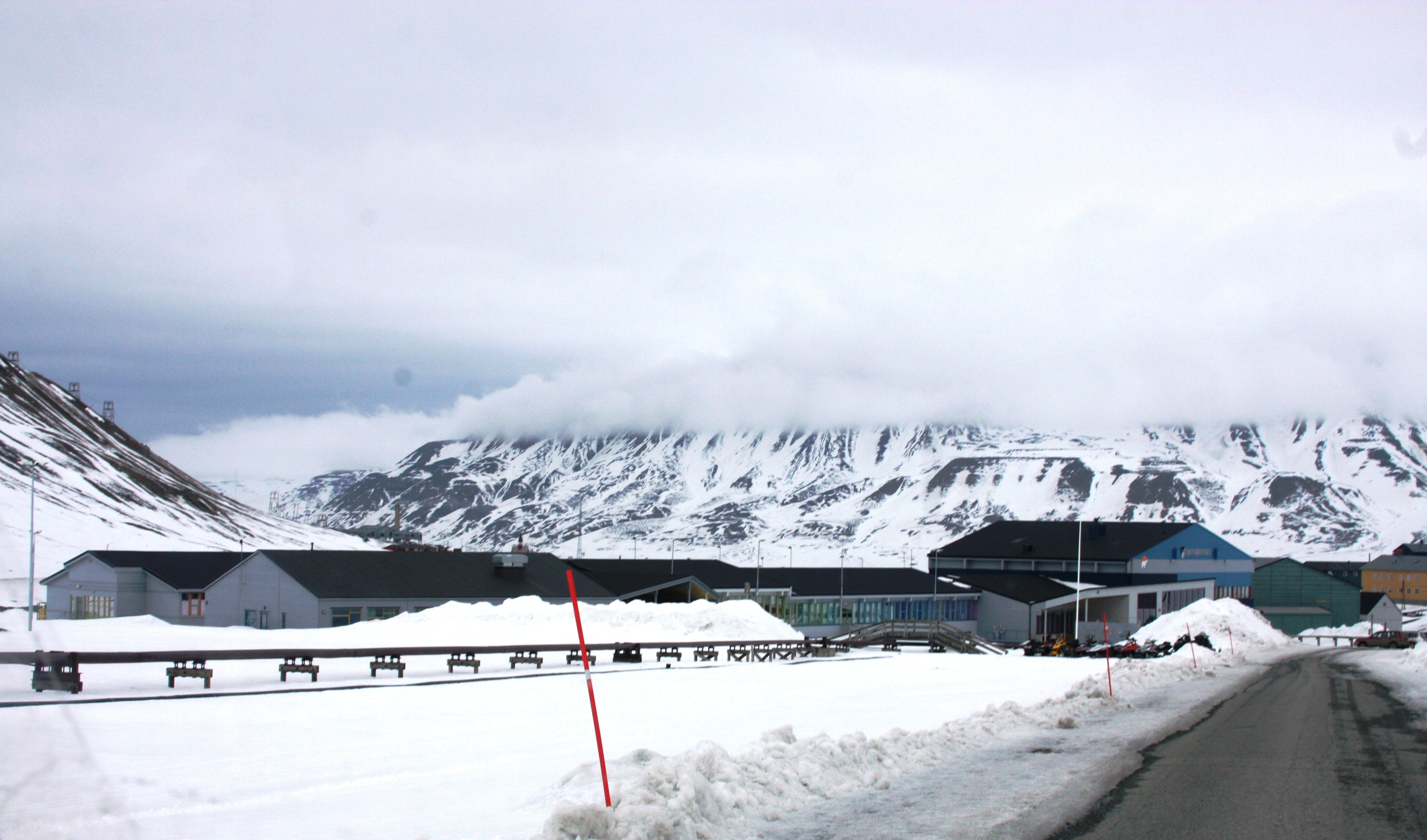
Longyearbyen School

Longyearbyen School serves ages 6–18. It is the northernmost primary and secondary school in the world. Once pupils reach ages 16 or 17 many families move to mainland Norway. There is a non-degree-offering tertiary educational institution in Longyearbyen, University Centre in Svalbard (UNIS), co-located with the Norwegian Polar Institute, Svalbard Museum, Svalbard Science Forum.

The Czech Josef Svoboda Arctic Research Station, is based in Longyearbyen. The station is the property of the University of South Bohemia in České Budějovice. The station is used by scientists from the Faculty of Science of the University of South Bohemia in České Budějovice, by scientists from the Czech University of Life Sciences Prague, the Czech Academy of Sciences. The station also provides facilities for scientists from foreign institutions.

== Transport ==
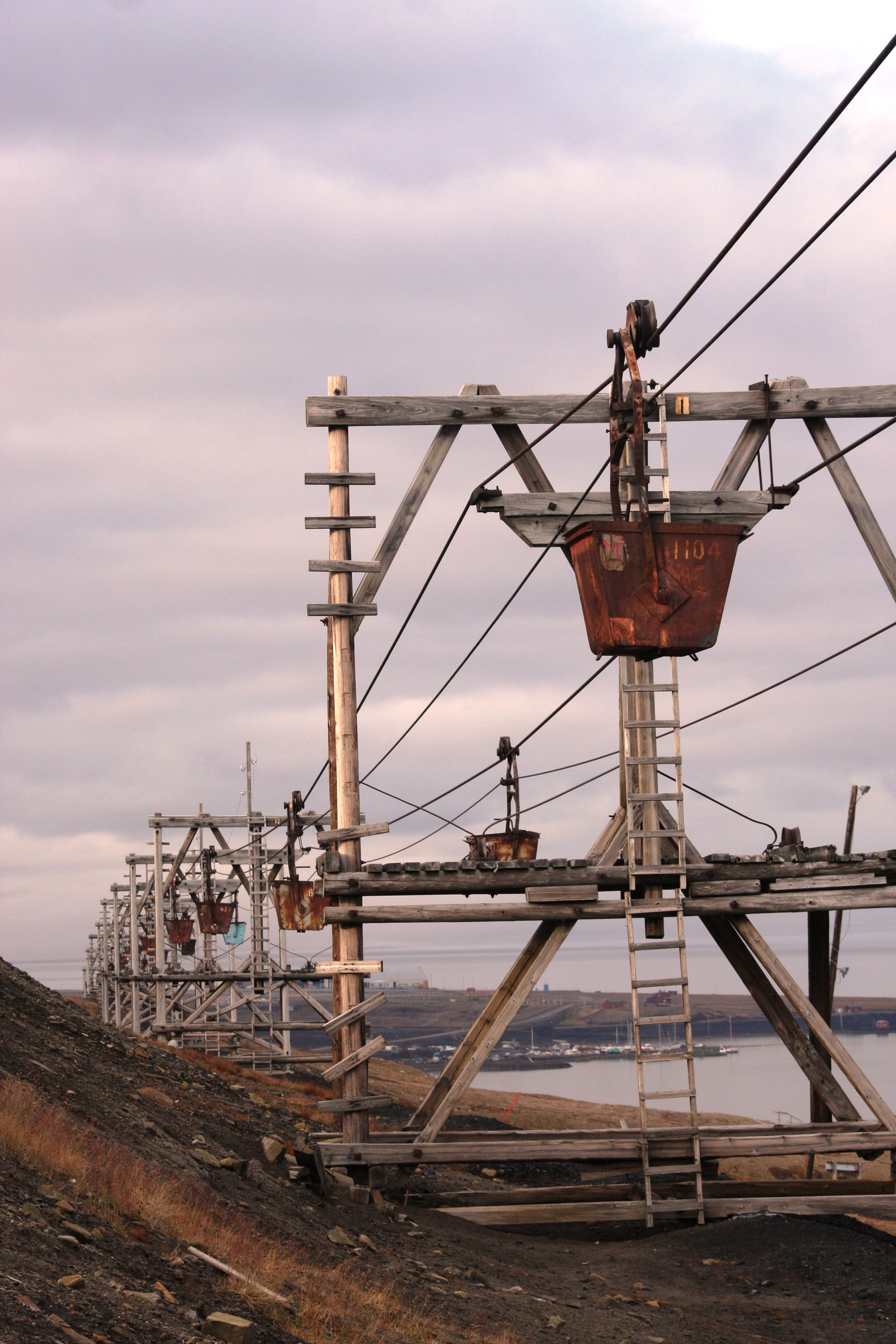
Until 1987, a series of aerial tramways were used to haul coal from the mines to the port.

Longyearbyen has a road network stretching 50 kilometers (30 mi), but the network does not extend to any other communities. In 2008 there were 1,481 registered road vehicles and 49 percent of all households had a car. Cars are registered with ZN registration plates. There is a single dealer who sells Toyotas, Svalbard Auto, which is also one of two businesses providing repairs.

Snowmobiles are a popular mode of transport, and there are more snowmobiles than residents. In 2008, there were registered 2,672 snowmobiles, and 69 per cent of households owned at least one in Longyearbyen. Off-road motorised transport is prohibited on bare ground, but snowmobiles are used extensively during winter—both for commercial and recreational activities. Transport from Longyearbyen to Barentsburg (45 km or 28 mi) and Pyramiden (100 km or 62 mi) is possible by snowmobile in winter, or by ship year round.

Svalbard Airport, Longyear is at Hotellneset, 5 kilometers (3.1 mi) northwest of town. It has a 2,483-meter (8,146 ft) long runway and is the only airport that is permitted to serve aircraft from the archipelago. Scandinavian Airlines operates daily flights to Oslo and Tromsø, and there are irregular flights to Russia. Lufttransport operates regular charter services to Svea Airport and Ny-Ålesund Airport, Hamnerabben. Arktikugol operates helicopters to Barentsburg and Pyramiden. There are two quays in Longyearbyen, one for the export of coal and one for general goods. From 1907 to 1987, the mining companies operated a network of aerial tramways to transport coal from the mines to the port. In 1900s the contemporary leading German wire ropeways company, Adolf Bleichert & Co. from Leipzig, built a material cableway from Mine 1 to the ship's loading station, which was later supplemented by a cableway to Mine 2.

== Gallery ==
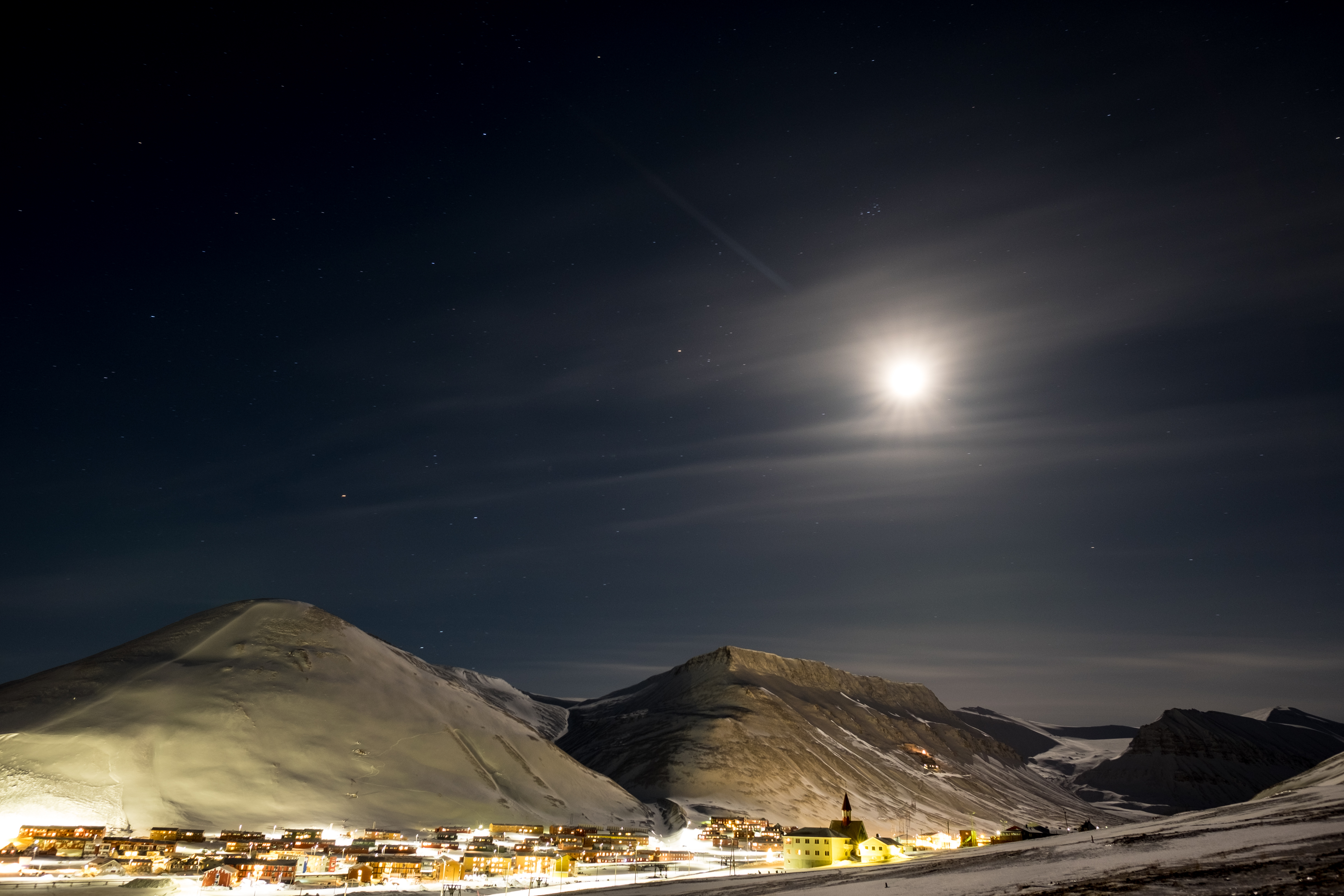
Longyearbyen at night

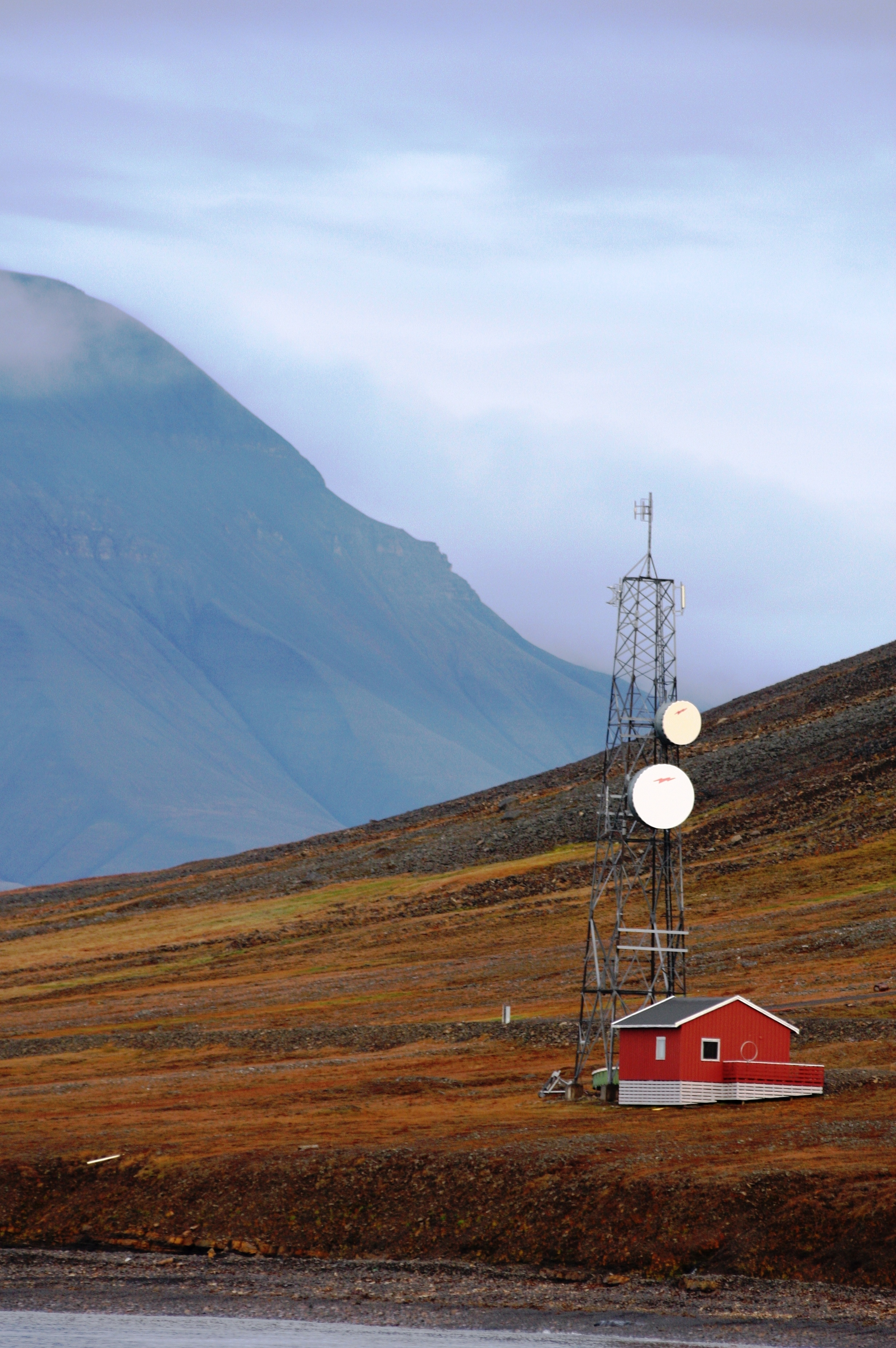
Bjørndalen base station

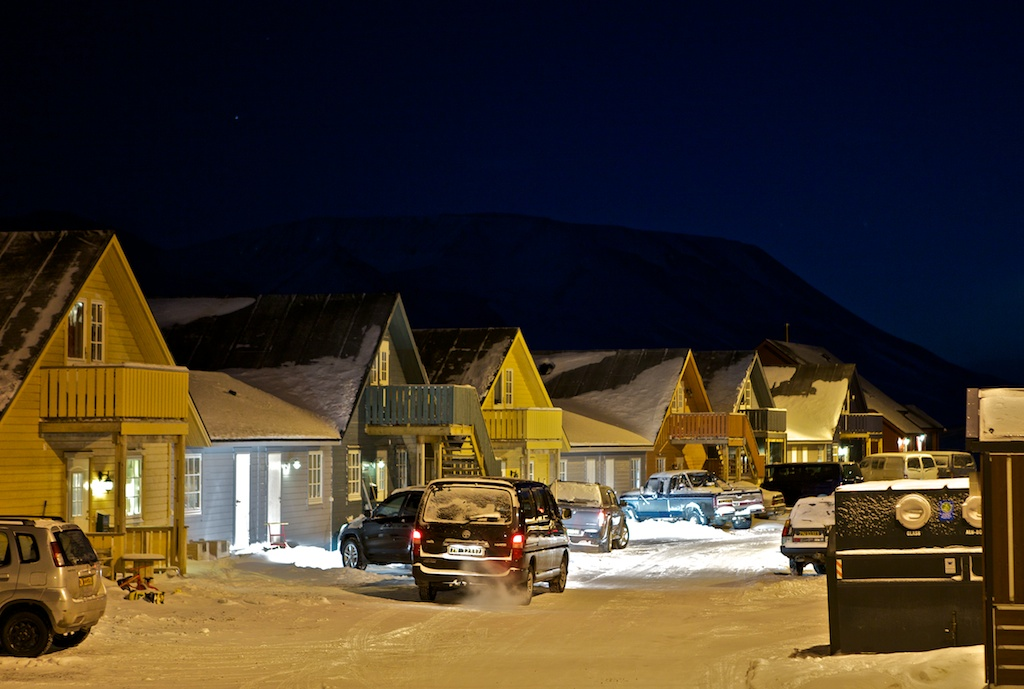
Houses in Longyearbyen

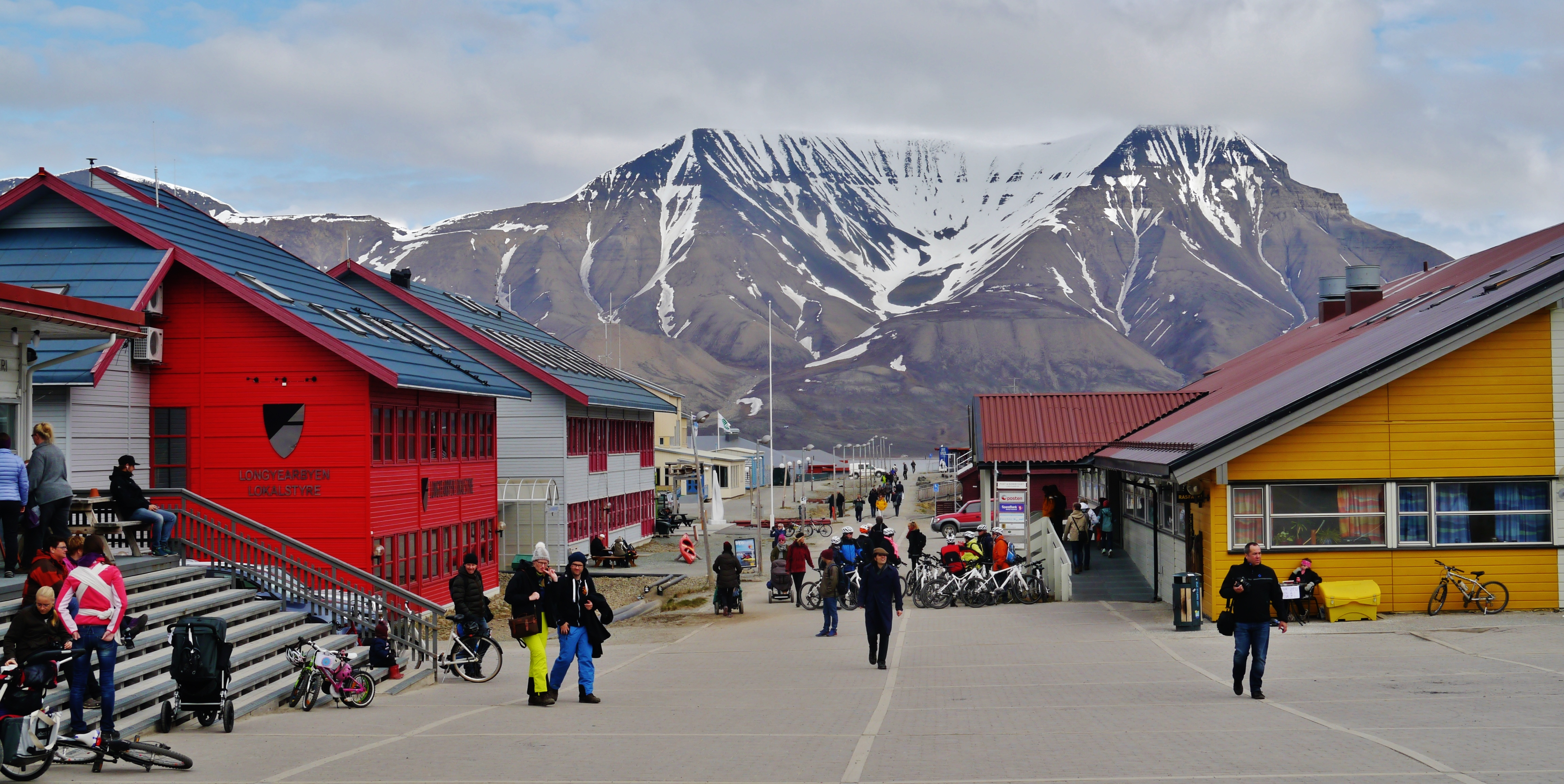
View of the city

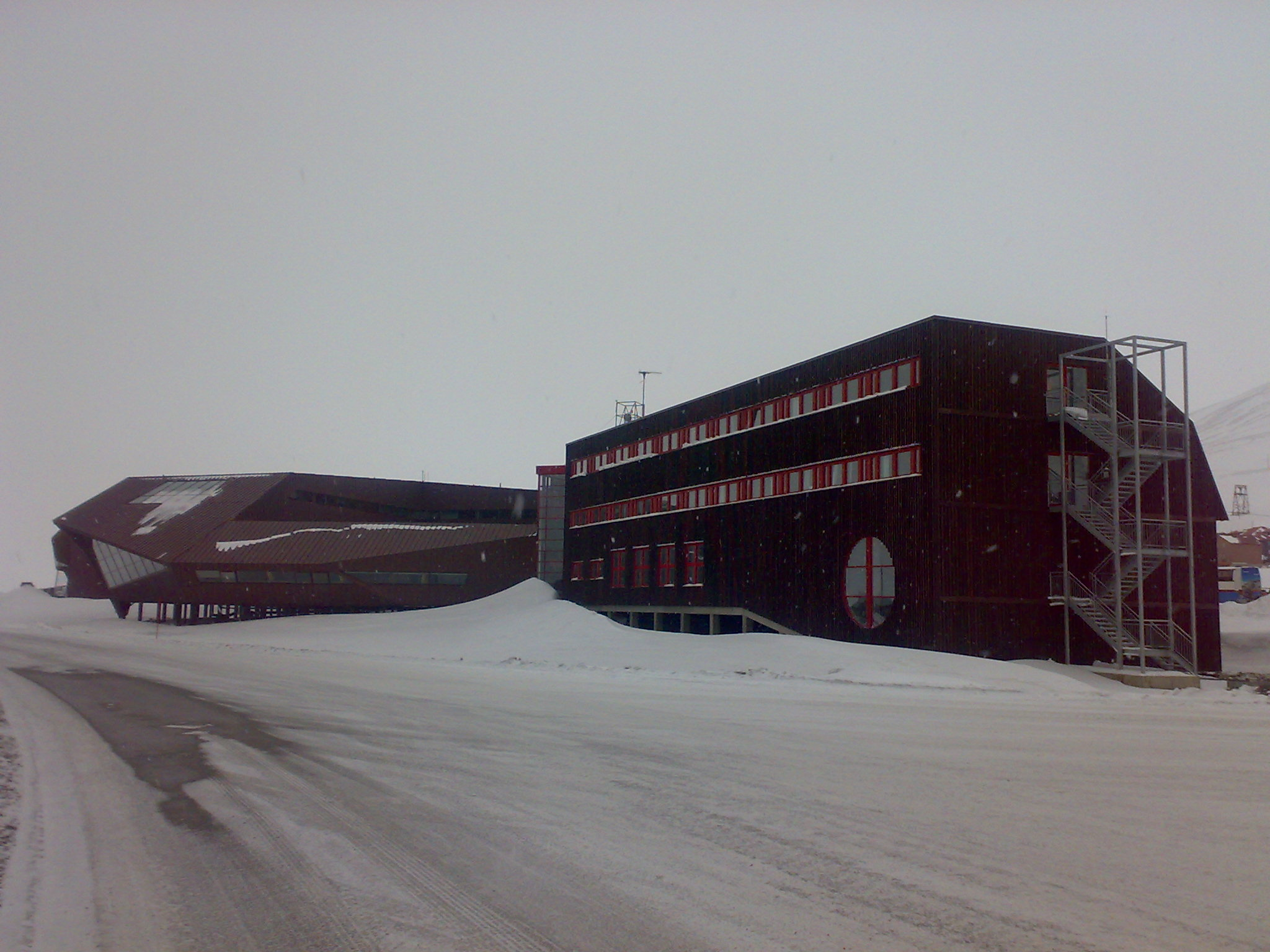
University Centre in Svalbard (UNIS)

== See also ==
- List of northernmost settlements
