= Svalbard Turn =

Sports club in Longyearbyen, Svalbard, Norway

Svalbard Turn is a sports club based in Longyearbyen, Norway.

== History ==
The club was established on 6 September 1930, initially focusing on gymnastics. Today, it offers a range of activities including alpine skiing, badminton, children's sports, football, athletics, handball, climbing, miniature shooting, pistol shooting, chess, skiing, spinning, swimming, gymnastics, and volleyball. The club operates out of Svalbardhallen, which opened in 1996.

Svalbard Turn is associated with Troms Sports Circle. The club organizes the Spitsbergen Marathon.
