= Arctic Film Festival =

Norwegian film festival

- Location: Longyearbyen, Svalbard, Norway
- Established: September 2019
- Founded by: Henrik Friis de Magalhães e Meneses
- Website: https://www.arcticfilmfestival.net/
- 2020 2019

Arctic Film Festival is an annual film festival held in September in the Norwegian archipelago, Svalbard's town, Longyearbyen. The festival is organized by HF Productions, and is a United Nations' Sustainable Development Goals' (SDGs) initiative. It is the northernmost film festival in the world.

== The festival ==
Arctic Film Festival was first started in September 2019 and is held annually at the only screening venue in Longyearbyen, Kulturhuset. The event takes filmmakers on environmental excursions in the Arctic region and programs roundtable discussions moderated by HF Head of Production Benn Wiebe. It is organized by Copenhagen-based production company HF Productions and received financial support under the United Nations' Sustainable Development Goals (SDGs) platform.

== Arctic Film Festival awards winners ==
=== 2019 ===
The following are the winners of the 2019 Arctic Film Festival are:

- Best Feature Film: Julia Blue (2018), director Roxy Toporowych
- Best Short Film: Night Shift (2018), director Marc Salameh
- Best Drama: Amaro (2019), director Fabian Fritz
- Best Feature Documentary: Salvage (2019), Amy C. Elliott
- Best Short Documentary: Eskimo Inc. (2019), director Max Baring
- Best Student Production: Games of Survival: A Culture Preserved in Ice (2019), director Nicholas Natale
- Best Special Mention: Rear View Mirror (2019), director Jonathan May
- Best Experimental: Backbone (2019), director Eilif Bremer Landsend
- Best Animated Short: Beyond Us - A Last Story after the Collapse (2019), director Maxime Tiberghien
- Best Music Score: Jetty (2018), director Logan Lanier
- Best Directing: Dancing With Monica (2017), director Anja Dalhoff
- Best Cinematography: Realms (2018), director Patrik Söderlund
- Best SDG Production: ZAN (2017), director Rick Grehan
- Best Screenplay: The Venusian Chronicles (2018), writer Lynn Vincentnathan
