= Svalbardbutikken =

Department store in Svalbard, Norway

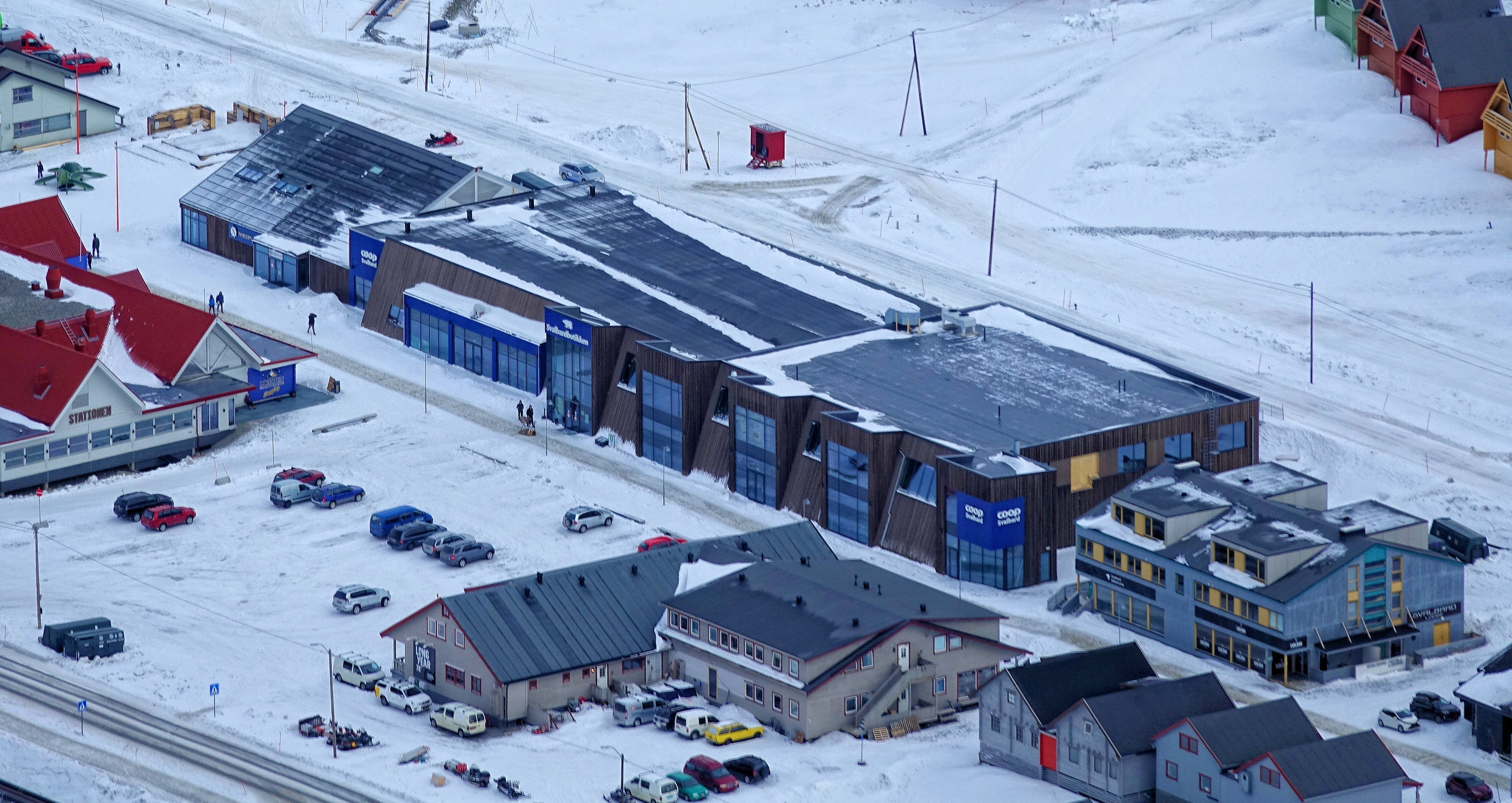
The new Svalbardbutikken building, opened in 2021.

Svalbardbutikken is a department store and the only grocery store in Longyearbyen, Svalbard, Norway. Owned and operated by Coop Svalbard BA, it sells groceries, fresh produce, duty-free items, souvenirs, perfumes, and gifts. It previously featured an electronics department which closed in May 2010. Svalbard's Vinmonopolet, the government-owned alcoholic beverage retailer, is located inside the store. Coop Svalbard also operates a kiosk at Svalbard Airport, Longyear.

Svalbardbutikken was established in 1992, and it took over the grocery business on the island from the Provianten grocery store, which opened in 1950.

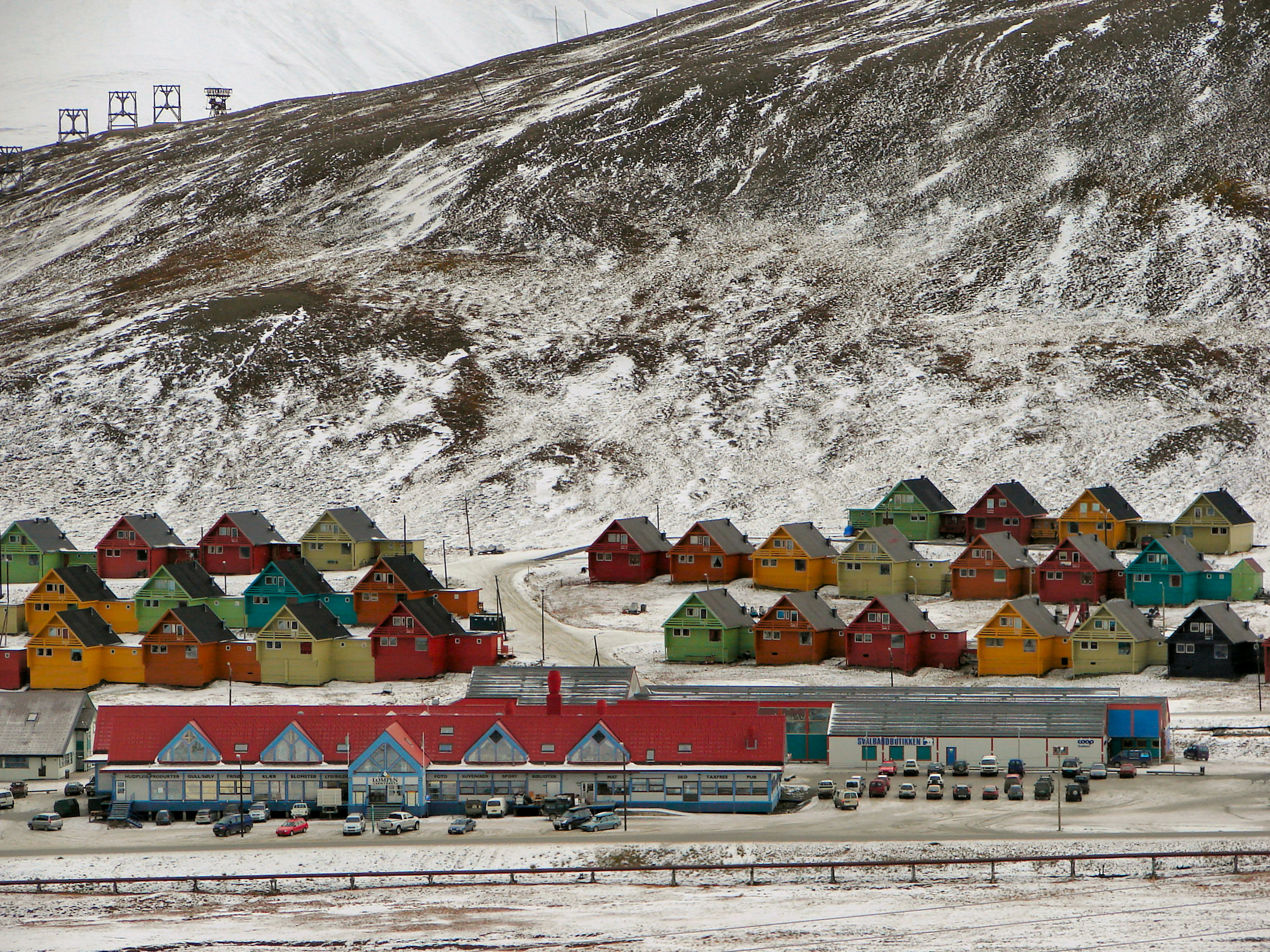
Svalbardbutikken in 2006, in the foreground to the right.

The fact that the business is located in Svalbard, an area remote from the rest of Norway, affects the prices of various goods differently. Svalbard is a tax-free area, and alcohol and tobacco products are therefore cheaper than in mainland Norway. During the summer, dry and frozen goods are transported to Svalbard by boat, and therefore food can cost about the same as on the mainland. But because all fresh produce must be transported to Svalbard by plane, it is more expensive than in other parts of Norway. The dependence on air freight also means that Svalbardbutikken and other stores on Svalbard can run out of some goods when the weather is too poor for planes to land.

There is no deposit on glass bottles and cans in Longyearbyen. There used to be a deposit scheme like the one on the mainland, but it was ended in 2000 because it was too expensive to transport empty bottles and cans back to the mainland for reuse.

The store does not officially form part of any of Coop Norge's mainland chains; the section signage and most grocery items loosely match those of Coop Mega.
