= Huset =

Huset (s) may refer to:

- Huset, the Danish name of the Danish TV series Prisoner
- Huset Restaurant, a fine dining restaurant in Svalbard, Norway
- Huset School, an historic school that is now part of Cass County Museum, in Walker, Minnesota, United States
- Huset (Copenhagen), a culture house in Copenhagen, Denmark
- Husets Biograf, an arthouse cinema in Copenhagen, Denmark (in the culture house)
- Husets Teater, a theatre in Copenhagen, Denmark (originally in the culture house)

== See also ==
- House (disambiguation)
- Huset's Speedway, a race track in South Dakota, US
