= Huset Restaurant =

Norwegian restaurant in Svalbard

- Interactive map of Huset Restaurant

Restaurant information
- Owner: Hurtigruten
- Head chef: Alberto Lozano Aviles
- Food type: Nordic fine dining
- Location: Vei 212, Longyearbyen, Svalbard, Norway
- Coordinates: 78.2076°N 15.5897°E
- Website: www.huset.com

Huset Restaurant is a Nordic fine dining restaurant located on Svalbard, a northern archipelago of Norway, and is located in the northernmost town in the world, Longyearbyen. Spanish chef Alberto Lozano Aviles is head chef.

== History ==
The Huset building was built in the 1950s as a community centre for miners in the village. The name means "house" in Norwegian. It operated as a post office, library, church, school, gymnasium and hunting shop. It was briefly used as a hospital after an avalanche.

In 2010, the building was converted into a bistro. Hurtigruten bought the restaurant in 2022 and converted it into a fine dining establishment. In 2022, the company invited Spanish chef Alberto Lozano to run the restaurant.

In 2026, extensive interior redesign and renovations were undertaken, designed by Norwegian architects Snøhetta.

== Description ==
Huset Restaurant is a Nordic fine dining restaurant located in Longyearbyen, Svalbard, which is the northernmost permanent settlement of more than 1,000 people in the world, lying only 1,288 km (800 mi) from the North Pole.

Its menu is based around local game meats and foraged ingredients, like seal, whale, and ptarmigan.

As of February 2026, Alberto Lozano Aviles remains head chef.
