= Adventtoppen =

Mountain on Spitsbergen, Norway

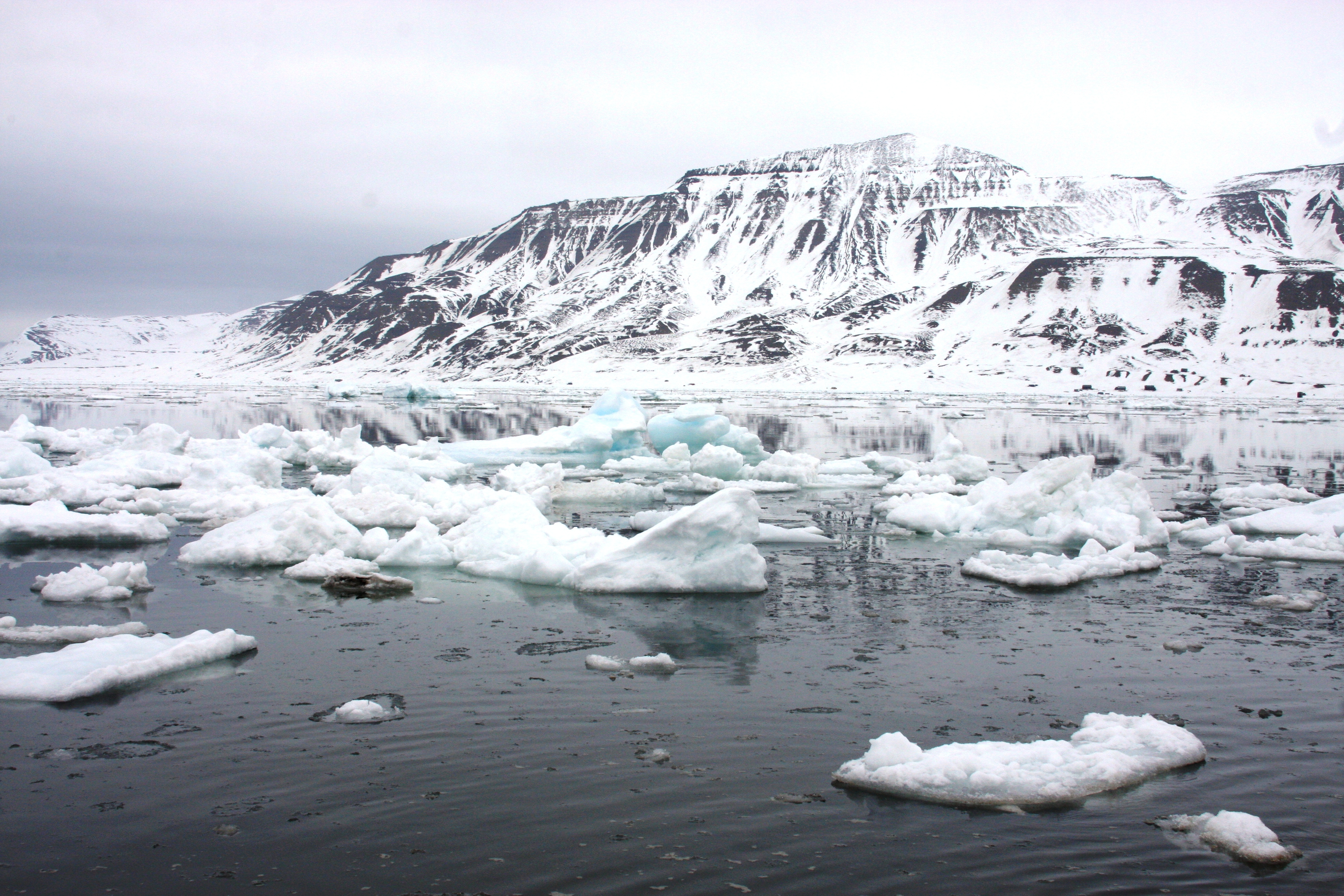

Highest point
- Elevation: 786 m (2,579 ft)
- Coordinates: 78°16′23″N 15°44′42″E

Geography
- Location within Svalbard
- Location: Spitsbergen, Svalbard, Norway

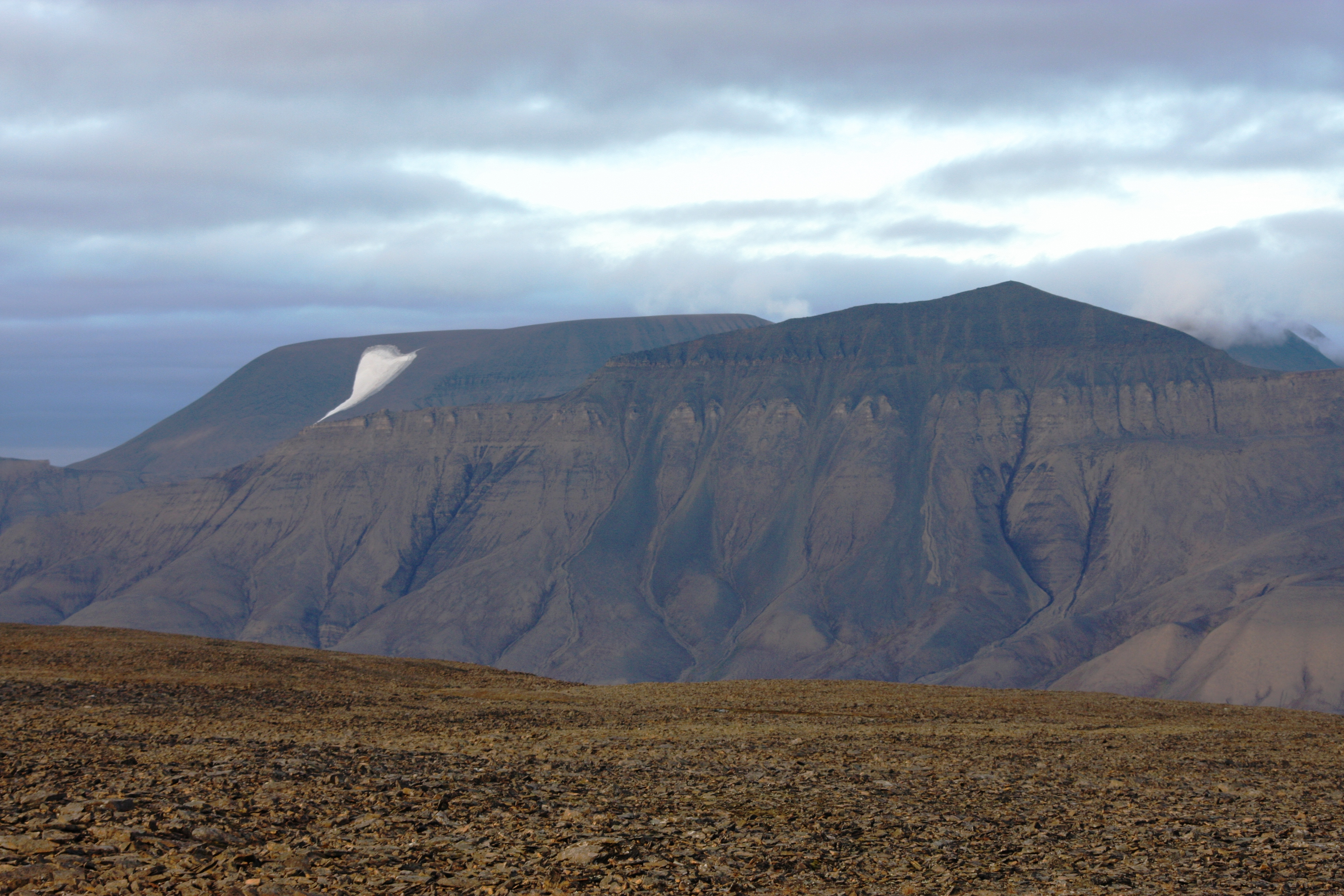

Adventtoppen is a mountain on the east side of Adventfjorden in the northern part of Nordenskiöld Land on the island of Spitsbergen in Svalbard, Norway. It is 786 metres (2,579 ft) tall. In 1901, Bergen-Spitsbergen Kullgrube-kompani started mining coal in Adventtoppen. During their first summer season, they mined 5 tonnes (4.9 long tons; 5.5 short tons). They lived on board their ship and freighted the coal with a row-boat. In 1903, they produced 40 tonnes (39 long tons; 44 short tons). The mountain was first ascended by A. Hoel in 1916. It was ascended again by W. Solheim and M. Abrahamsen on 23 July 1922 for triangulation and photogrammetric work.
