= List of northernmost items =

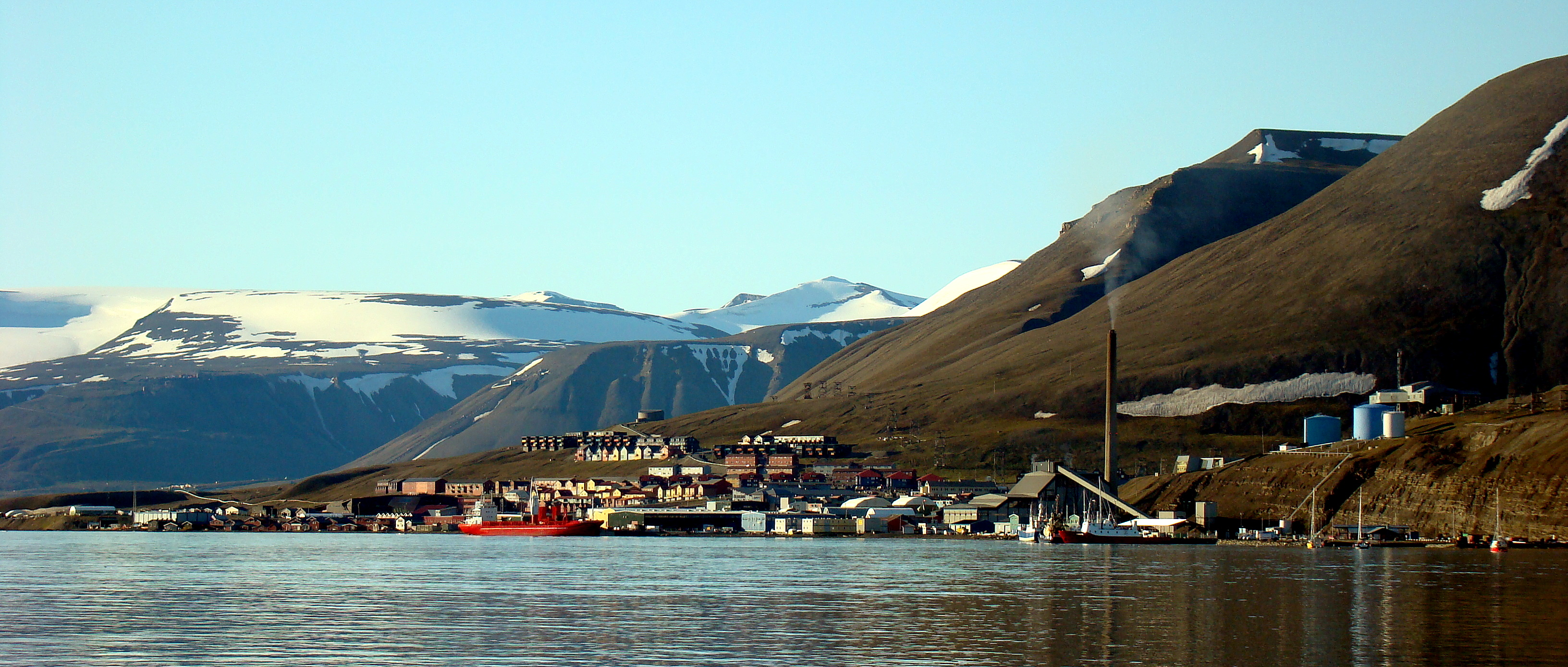
Longyearbyen in Svalbard (2008)

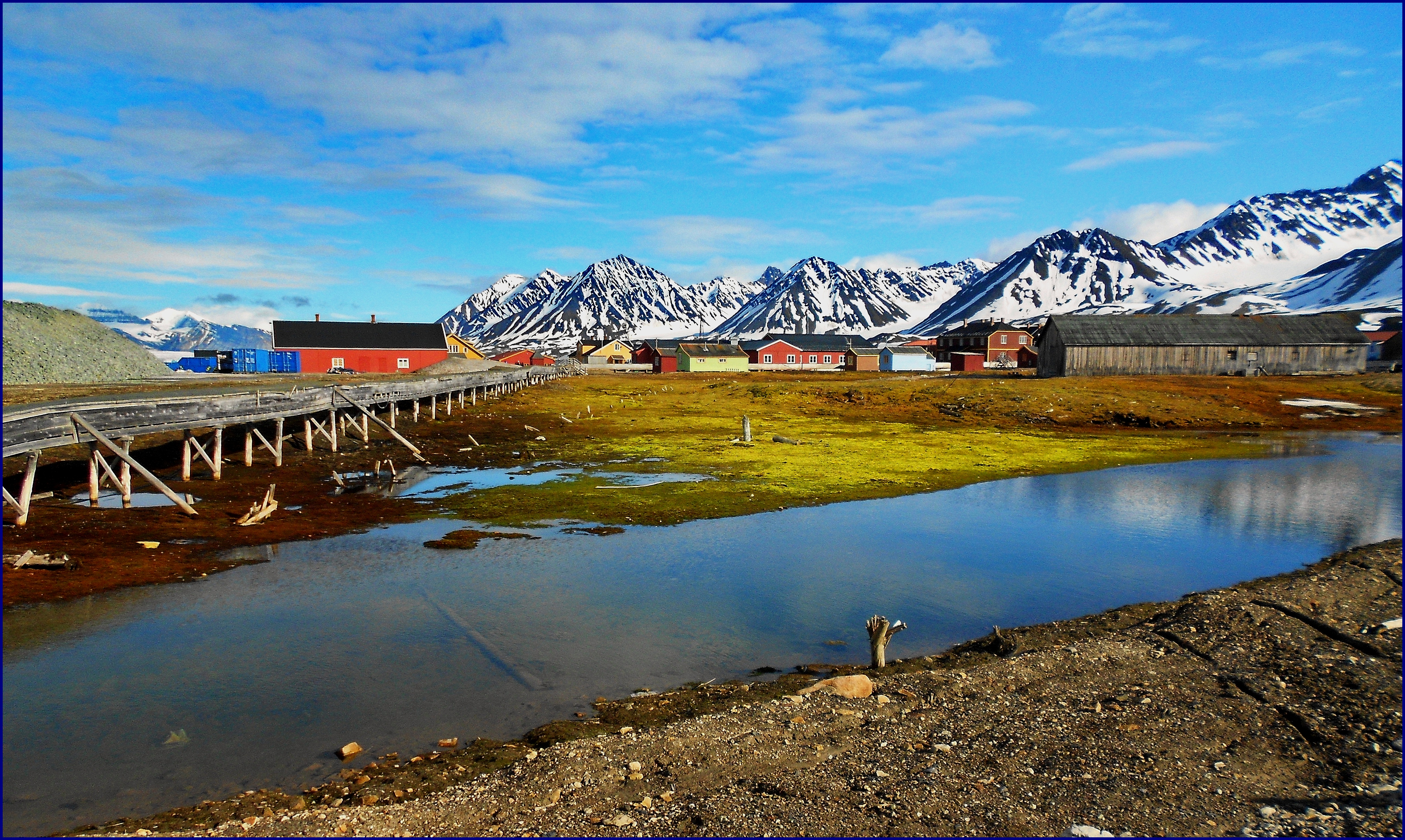
Ny-Ålesund at 79°N – location of the northernmost hotel, restaurant, and camping site.

This is a list of various northernmost things on Earth.

== Cities and settlements ==
Category	Place	Latitude/longitude
Capital (of an independent state)	Reykjavík, Iceland	64°08′N 21°56′W
Capital (of an autonomous territory)	Nuuk, Greenland	64°10′N 51°44′W
Non-permanent settlement of any size	Camp Barneo	88°11′N 30°45′W (may vary as it changes every summer)
Permanent settlement of any size	Alert, Nunavut (CFS Alert), Canada	82°28′N 62°30′W
Non-active public settlement (ghost town)	Wandel Dal Settlements, Greenland	82°15′N 35°15′W
Active public settlement	Ny-Ålesund, Svalbard, Norway	78°55′30″N 11°55′20″E
Village inhabited by native people	Siorapaluk, Greenland	77°47′08″N 70°38′00″W
Medieval town	Vágar, Austvågøy, Lofoten, Norway	68°20′N 14°40′E
City > 1,000 people	Longyearbyen, Svalbard, Norway	78°13′N 15°33′E
City > 2,500 people	Khatanga, Russia	71°59′N 102°28′E
City > 4,000 people	Tiksi, Russia	71°38′N 128°52′E
City > 4,500 people	Utqiagvik, Alaska, United States	71°17′N 156°47′W
City > 5,000 people	Hammerfest, Norway	70°39′45″N 23°41′00″E
City > 10,000 people	Hammerfest, Norway	70°39′45″N 23°41′00″E
City > 25,000 people	Tromsø, Norway	69°40′33″N 18°55′10″E
City > 50,000 people	Norilsk, Russia	69°21′N 88°12′E
City > 100,000 people	Norilsk, Russia	69°21′N 88°12′E
City > 250,000 people	Murmansk, Russia	68°58′N 33°05′E
City > 300,000 people	Arkhangelsk, Russia	64°32′N 40°32′E
City > 350,000 people	Yakutsk, Russia	62°02′N 129°44′E
City > 375,000 people	Surgut, Russia	61°16′N 73°24′E
City > 500,000 people	Helsinki, Finland	60°10′15″N 24°56′15″E
City > 1,000,000 people	Saint Petersburg, Russia	59°57′N 30°18′E
City > 2,500,000 people	Saint Petersburg, Russia	59°57′N 30°18′E
City > 5,000,000 people	Saint Petersburg, Russia	59°57′N 30°18′E
City > 10,000,000 people Metropolitan area > 20,000,000 people	Moscow, Russia	55°45′N 37°37′E
Metropolitan area > 25,000,000 people	Tokyo, Japan	35°41′N 139°41′E

== Geography ==
Category	Place	Latitude/longitude
Lake	Kaffeklubben Sø, Greenland	83°35′N 32°35′W
Pond	Lake North Pole, North Pole (on ice)	85°N 5°W
Permanent island	Kaffeklubben Island, Greenland	83°40′N 29°50′W
Non-permanent island	Qeqertaq Avannarleq, Greenland	
Lake island	Gatter Island, Lake Hazen, Canada	81°55′4.8″N 69°5′34.8″W
Archipelago	Arctic Archipelago, Canada (northernmost point, Cape Columbia, Ellesmere Island)	83°06′41″N 069°57′30″W
Sea	Lincoln Sea, Greenland and Canada	83°37′N 32°31′W (northernmost point)
Bay	Constable Bay, Greenland	83°36′N 32°33′W
Mountain range	Roosevelt Range, Greenland	83°16′N 35°0′W
National park	Northeast Greenland National Park, Greenland	83°40′N 29°50′W (northernmost point)
Continental mainland	Cape Chelyuskin, Taymyr Peninsula, Krasnoyarsk Krai, Russia	77°44′N 104°15′E
Active volcano	Beerenberg, Jan Mayen, Norway	71°4′36″N 8°9′52″W
Coral reef	Korallen, Finnmark, Norway	70°40′N 22°00′E
Location with all monthly average temperatures above freezing	Bø Municipality, Nordland, Norway	68°37′N 14°27′E
Crater lake	Lake Lappajärvi, Lappajärvi, Finland	63°7′N 23°40′E
Beach of southern type	Farstadsanden, Hustadvika Municipality, Norway	62°54′28″N 7°6′30″E
Active sand dunes	Great Kobuk Sand Dunes, Alaska, United States	67°03′42″N 158°56′44″W
Coral atoll	Kure Atoll, Hawaii, United States	28°25′16″N 178°19′55″W
Tropical sea	Red Sea	22°N 38°E

== Nature ==
=== Wild animals ===
Animal	Place	Latitude/longitude
Fresh water fish: arctic char	Arctic Ocean	Approx. 82°N
Coral reef	Off the north coast of Norway	71°15′N 25°0′E
Amphibian: Siberian wood frog	Northern Siberia	Approx. 71°N
Bat colony (naturally occurring)	Rundhaug, Målselv Municipality (Troms), Norway	68°58′30″N 19°3′52″E
Reptile: viviparous lizard	Scandinavia and Russia	Approx. 68°N
Snake: European adder	Arctic Circle	Approx. 66°34′N
Scorpion: Northern scorpion	Red Deer County, Alberta, Canada	52°16′5″N 113°48′40″W
Tortoise: Horsfield tortoise	Southern Kazakhstan	Approx. 48°67′N
Non-human primate colony	Shimokita Peninsula, Honshu, Japan	41°32′N 140°55′E
Parrot: Alexandrine parakeet	Area of Jalalabad, Afghanistan	34°26′03″N 70°26′52″E
Penguin: Galapagos penguin	Galápagos Islands, Ecuador	0°40′N 90°33′W

=== Plants ===
These lists only contain naturally occurring plants and trees, excluding individuals planted by humans.

==== General ====
Plant	Place	Latitude/longitude
Flower	Arctic Poppy on Kaffeklubben Island	83°40′N 29°50′W
Forest	Lukunsky grove of Dahurian larch, south from Khatanga River, Krasnoyarsk Krai, Russia	72°31′N 105°03′E
Temperate rainforest	Prince William Sound, Alaska, United States	60°36′54″N 147°10′05″W
Palms (European fan palm Chamaerops humilis)	Nice, Mediterranean coast of southern France	43°42′N 7°15′E
Papyrus swamp	Hula Valley, Israel	33°6′12″N 35°36′33″E
Lowland tropical rainforest	Namdapha National Park, India	27°44′N 96°53′E

==== Shrubs ====
Plant	Place	Latitude/longitude
Willow (Arctic willow Salix arctica)	Reaches the northern limits of land in Greenland	

==== Trees ====
Plant	Place	Latitude/longitude
Larch (Dahurian larch Larix gmelinii)	About 150 kilometres (93 mi) westward of Khatanga River outfall, Taymyr Peninsula, Siberia, Russia. This location is that of the northernmost tree of any kind (this is a creeping form of Dahurian larch)	73°04′32″N 102°00′00″E

== Education ==
Category	Place	Latitude/longitude
Kindergarten	Kullungen barnehage and Polarflokken barnehage, Longyearbyen, Svalbard, Norway	78.22°N 15.65°E (coordinates of Longyearbyen)
Primary/secondary school	Longyearbyen School, Longyearbyen, Svalbard, Norway	78.20°N 15.61°E
Higher education institute	University Centre in Svalbard, Longyearbyen, Svalbard, Norway	78°13′N 15°36′E
Agricultural school	Tana videregående skole, Tana Municipality, Norway	70.438307°N 28.248596°E
Montessori school	Tana Montessoriskole, Tana Municipality, Norway	70.235095°N 28.193981°E
Folk high school	Svalbard Folkehøgskole, Longyearbyen, Svalbard, Norway	78.22400°N 15.64880°E
International Baccalaureate	Kirkenes, Norway	69.688332°N 30.000539°E
Music conservatory	Conservatory of Tromsø, Tromsø, Norway	69.636076°N 18.914459°E
Art school	Karasjok, Norway	69.469836°N 25.511189°E
University	University of Tromsø, Tromsø, Norway	69°40′N 18°56′E
Gardening school	Rå videregående skole, Borkenes, Norway	68.775058°N 16.176908°E
Catholic school	St. Eystein skole, Bodø, Norway (Primary school) Monroe Catholic High School, Fairbanks, Alaska, United States (High school)	67.275757°N 14.366561°E 64.851296°N 147.715669°W
Architecture school	University of Oulu, Oulu, Finland	65.059291°N 25.466240°E
School for the deaf	Kristinaskolan School for the Deaf, Härnösand, Sweden	62.627719°N 17.949657°E

== Science and technology ==
Category	Place	Latitude/longitude
Scientific laboratory	Camp Barneo, Russian arctic laboratory	Floating relatively close to the North Pole
Observatory	Arctic Geodetic Earth Observatory, Ny-Ålesund, Svalbard, Norway	78°55′N 11°56′E
Sewage farm	Kings Bay, Ny-Ålesund, Svalbard, Norway	78°55′N 11°56′E
LTE cell tower	Longyearbyen, Svalbard, Norway	78.22°N 15.65°E
Oil platform	Goliat, Arctic Ocean	71°39′N 25°53′E
Wind farm	Tiksi, Yakutia, Russia	71.65°N 128.866667°E
LNG plant	Melkøya, Hammerfest, Norway	70.690°N 23.599°E
High voltage power line	Balsfjord-Hammerfest, Norway	70°39′45″N 23°41′00″E
Planetarium	Northern Light Planetarium, Tromsø, Troms, Norway	69.679113°N 18.971710°E
Web conferencing	Tag-IT, Tromsø, Norway	69°40′58″N 18°56′34″E
Astronomical Observatory	Skibotn Observatory, Storfjord Municipality, Norway	69.391667°N 20.269722°E
Smeltery	Finnfjord AS, Finnsnes, Norway	69.221222°N 18.086540°E
Permanent launch facility for sounding rockets & scientific balloons	Andøy Municipality, Norway	69°5′40″N 15°45′52″E
Radioactive waste plant	Murmansk, Russia	68°58′N 33°05′E
Solar power station	Grise Fiord, Canada	76.416667°N 82.895833°W
Car testing center	White Hell, Saariselkä, Inari, Finland	68°15′N 28°10′E
Nuclear Power Plant (mobile)	Akademik Lomonosov, Pevek harbor, Chukotka Autonomous Okrug, Russia	69°42′35″N 170°18′36″E
Spaceport	Esrange Space Center, Jukkasjärvi, Kiruna, Sweden	67.893157°N 21.064685°E
Laser cutting machine	LKAB Mekaniska, Kiruna, Sweden	67°51′N 20°13′E
Biogas plant	Ammattiopisto Lappia, Tervola, Finland	66.158504°N 24.991134°E
Crusher	Kajaanin Romu, Kajaani, Finland	64.217726°N 27.685214°E
Psycholinguistics and neurolinguistics laboratory	University Hospital of Trondheim, Trondheim, Norway	63.421038°N 10.388050°E

== Historical sites and archaeological findings ==
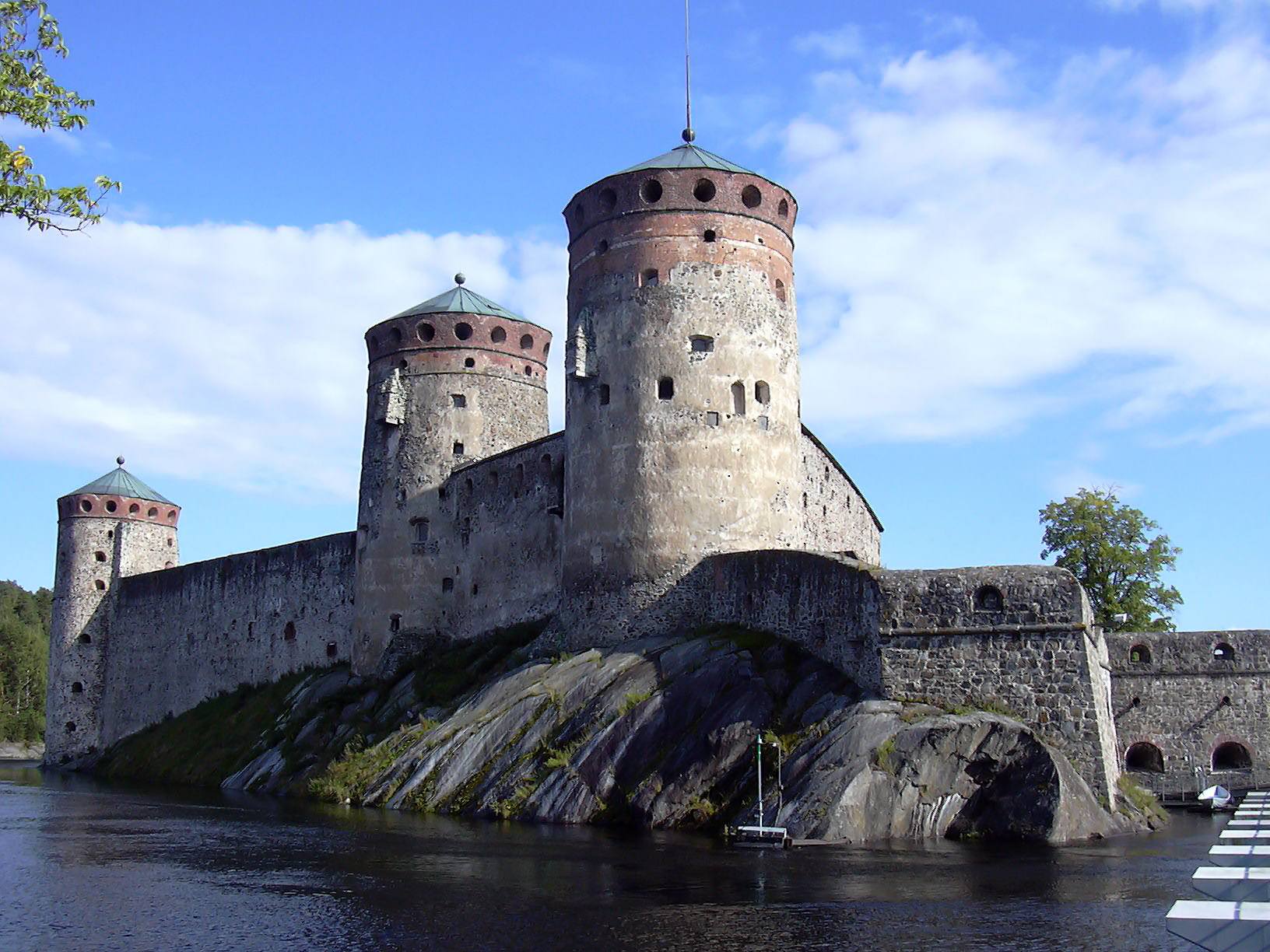
Olavinlinna, Savonlinna, Finland

Category	Place	Latitude/longitude
Confirmed archaeological site of Neolithic Stone Age	Bliss Bay site, Peary Land, Greenland, Denmark	83°33′N 29°00′W
Known shipwreck	Breadalbane, near Beechey Island, Nunavut, Canada	74°41′N 91°50′W
Archaeological site of Paleolithic Stone Age	Berelekh site, Siberia, Russia	71°0′N 148°54′E
Fortress	Vardøhus Fortress, Vardø, Norway	70°22′20″N 31°5′40″E
Discovered medieval coin	Alta, Norway	69°58′36″N 23°17′45″E
Bronze Age archaeological site	Sandvika, Brensholmen, Kvaløya, Tromsø Municipality, Norway	69°35′57″N 18°1′23″E
Discovered Byzantine coin	Ljønes, Bodø Municipality, Norway	67°28′N 14°40′E
Runestone (remains near original location)	Frösö Runestone, Frösö, Sweden	63°11′30″N 14°32′30″E
Runestone (original site, not there anymore)	Kingittorsuaq Runestone, Kingittorsuaq Island, Greenland	72°58′N 56°13′W
Medieval stone castle	Olavinlinna, Savonlinna, Finland	61°51′50″N 28°54′0″E
Cave painting	Kapova Cave, Burzyansky District, Bashkortostan, Russia	53.044444°N 57.063889°E
Discovered megalithic coffin	Hylligrava, Hyllibråten garden, Indre Østfold Municipality, Norway	59°36′55″N 11°04′35″E
Windmills	Village Kimzha, Mezen, Arkhangelsk Region, Russia	65°34′16″N 44°36′54″E

== Recreation ==
=== General ===
Category	Place	Latitude/longitude
Circus	Sirkus Svalnardo, Longyearbyen, Svalbard, Norway	78.22°N 15.65°E
Naturist beach	Kjølnes, Berlevåg Municipality, Norway	70.853049°N 29.235713°E
Escape room	Arctic Escape, Tromsø, Troms, Norway	69.648769°N 18.953888°E
Water amusement park	Norilsk, Russia	69.3590°N 88.1825°E
Natural playground	Fabeløya Natural Playground, Hamnvik, Norway	68.733283°N 16.851120°E
Theme park	Angry Birds Park, Saariselkä, Inari, Finland	68.420344°N 27.418821°E
Geocaching Mega-event	Midnight Sun Geocaching, Saariselkä, Inari, Finland	68°25.25′N 27°25.03′E
Hot air balloon festival	Arctic Balloon Adventure, Gällivare, Sweden	67°08′N 20°39′E
Travelling funfair	Hugos Tivoli, Levanger and Mo i Rana, Norway	66°18′46″N 14°8′34″E
Beach resort/spa hotel (opened 1886 or 1888; closed 1918)	Nordanskär Island, Kalix, Sweden	65°51′N 23°10′E
Permanent roller coaster	Alpin Coaster, Namsskogan Familiepark, Trones, Norway	64.744456°N 12.847041°E
Amusement park	PowerPark, Alahärmä, Kauhava, Finland	63.228013°N 22.858622°E

=== Culture and music ===
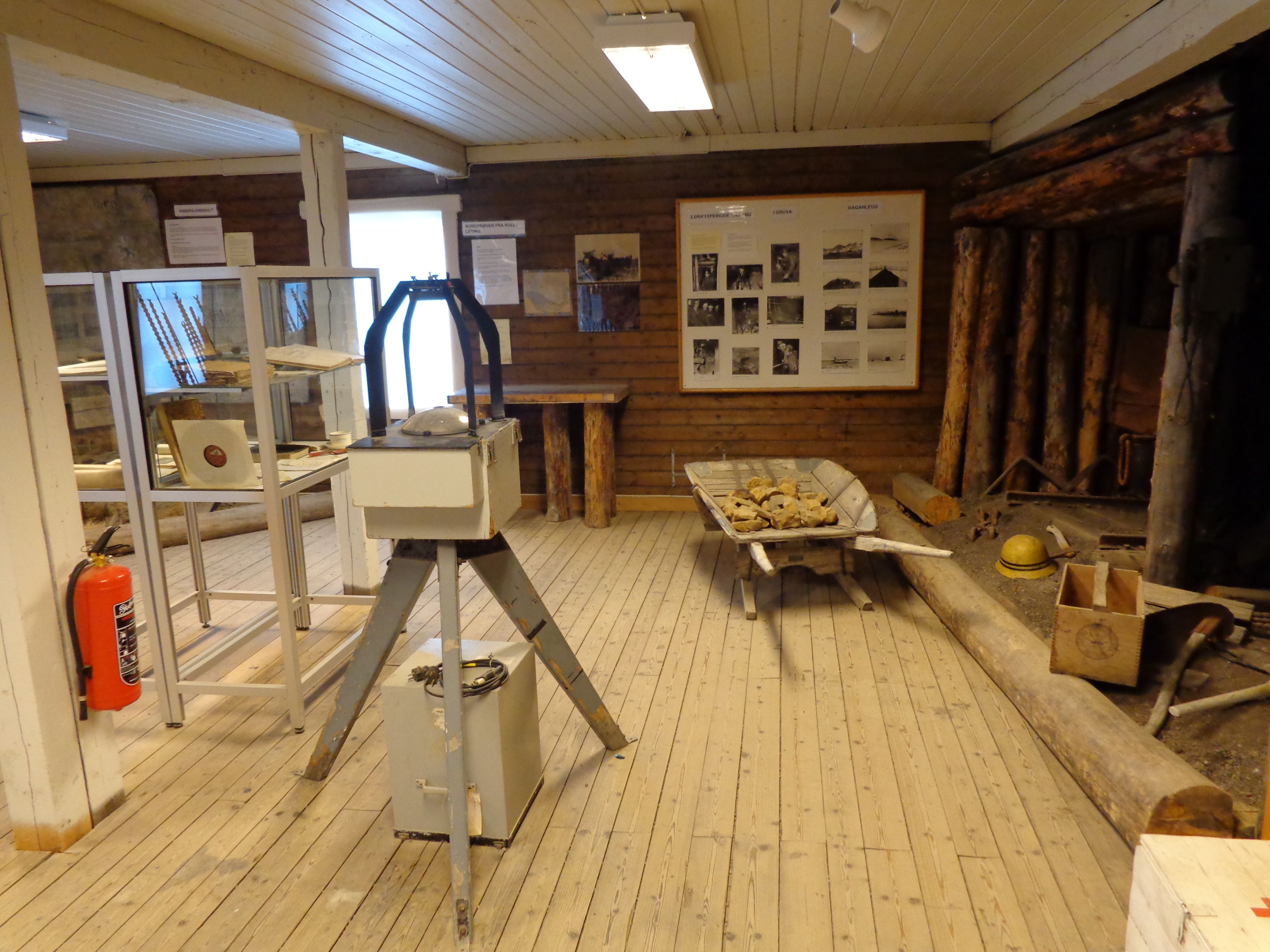
Ny-Ålesund Town and Mine Museum, Svalbard, Norway

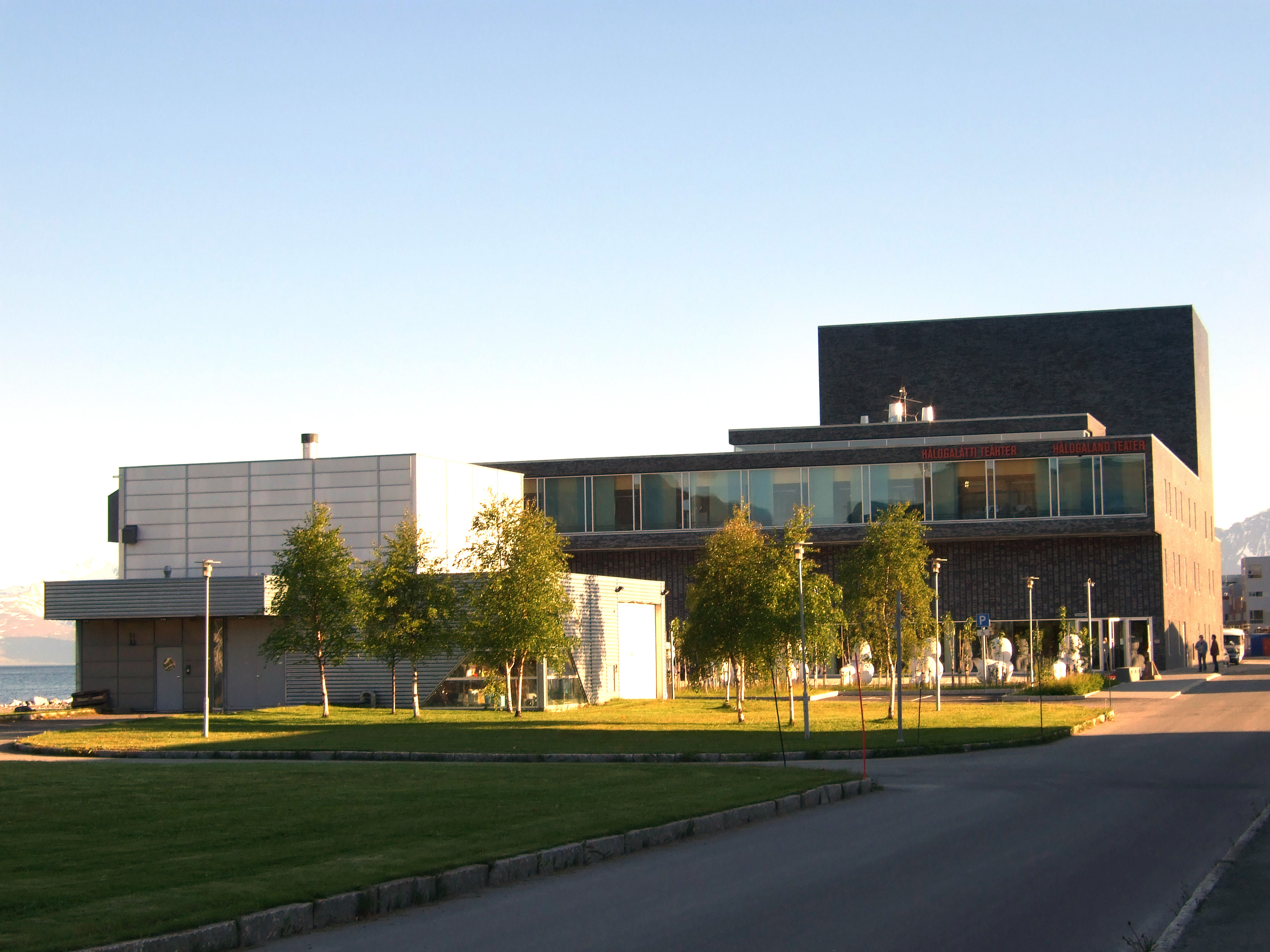
Hålogaland Teater, Tromsø, Norway

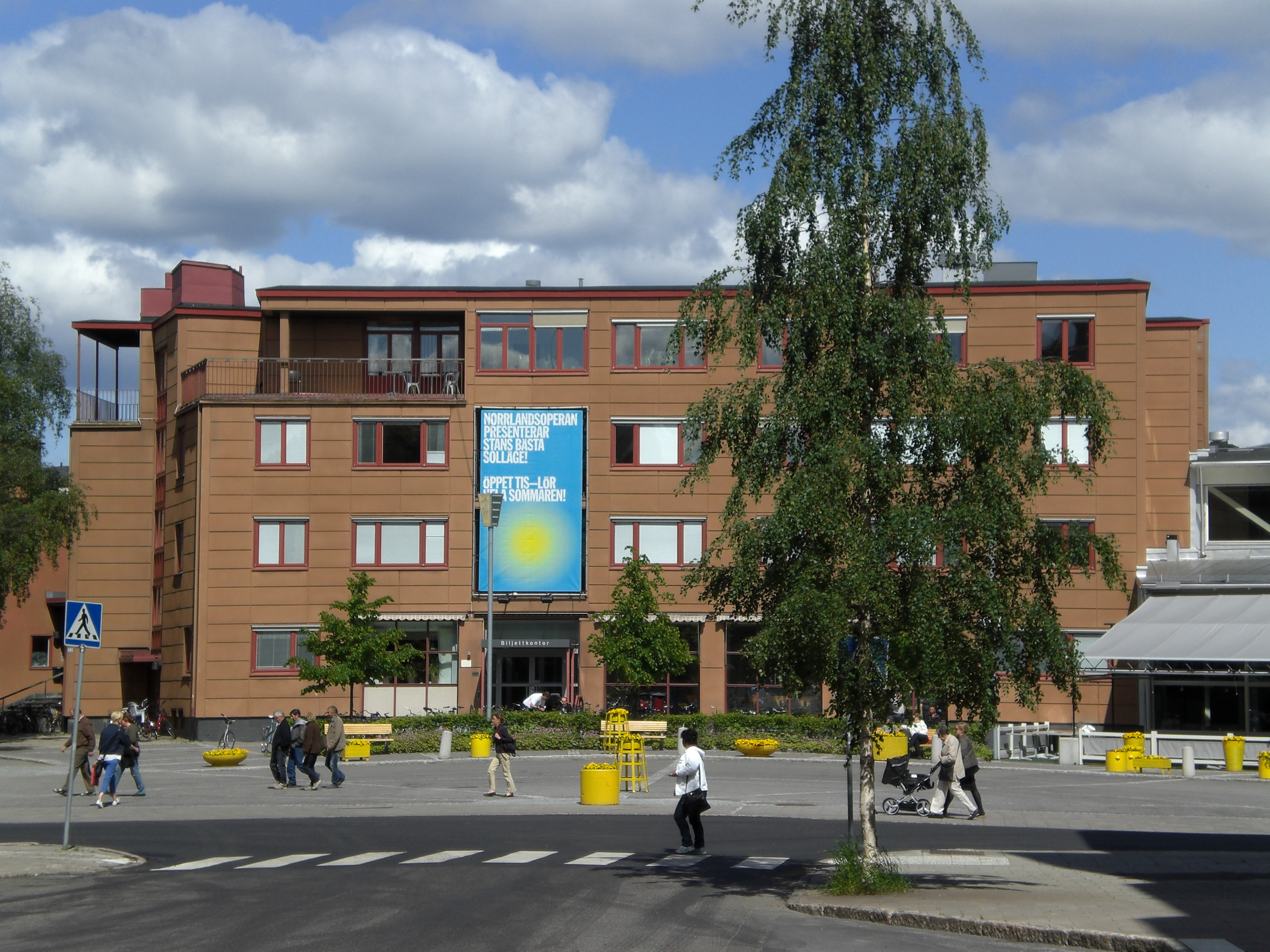
Norrlandsoperan, Umeå, Sweden

Category	Place	Latitude/longitude
Museum	Ny-Ålesund Town and Mine Museum, Ny-Ålesund, Svalbard, Norway	78°55′30″N 11°55′20″E
Piano	Pyramiden, Svalbard, Norway	78°41′N 16°24′E
Chamber music festival	Arctic Chamber Music Festival, Longyearbyen, Svalbard, Norway	78.22°N 15.62°E
Children's choir	Polargospel, Longyearbyen, Svalbard, Norway	78.22°N 15.62°E
Electric Organ	Svalbard Church, Longyearbyen, Svalbard, Norway	78.22°N 15.62°E
Literature festival	Longyearbyen Literature Festival, Longyearbyen, Svalbard, Norway	78.22°N 15.62°E
Men's chorus	Store Norske Mandskor, Longyearbyen, Svalbard, Norway	78.22°N 15.62°E
Mixed choir	Longyearbyen blandakor, Longyearbyen, Svalbard, Norway	78.22°N 15.62°E
Oktoberfest	Oktoberfest 78° Nord, Longyearbyen, Svalbard, Norway	78.22°N 15.65°E
Cinema	Kulturhuset, Longyearbyen, Svalbard, Norway	78.219502°N 15.643380°E
Art gallery	The Gallery and Longyearbyen Arts & Crafts Centre, Longyearbyen, Svalbard, Norway	78°20′N 15°59′E
Blues festival	Dark Season Blues, Longyearbyen, Svalbard, Norway	78°15′N 15°31′E
Rock festival	Spitsbergen Rock festival, Longyearbyen, Svalbard, Norway	78°15′N 15°31′E
Jazz festival	Polarjazz, Longyearbyen, Svalbard, Norway	78°15′N 15°31′E
Photo club	Longyearbyen fotoklubb, Longyearbyen, Svalbard, Norway	78°15′N 15°31′E
Pipe organ	Qaanaaq church, Qaanaaq, Greenland, Denmark	77°28′00″N 69°13′50″W
Open-air museum	Upernavik, Greenland, Denmark	72°47′13″N 56°08′50″W
Beer Festival	Skarsvåg, Norway	71°06′47″N 25°49′37″E
Graffiti	Gjesvær, Norway	71°05′53″N 25°22′34″E
Christmas museum	Mehamn, Gamvik Municipality, Norway	71°02′08″N 27°50′57″E
Film festival	Nordkapp filmfestival, Honningsvåg, Norway	70°58′43″N 25°58′36″E
Film studio	Orto Polare AS, Kjøllefjord, Norway	70°56′44″N 27°20′47″E
Dance theatre	Stellaris DansTeater, Hammerfest, Norway	70.674195°N 23.656032°E
String orchestra	Oppstryk Finnmark, Hammerfest, Norway	70.664141°N 23.689717°E
Dance festival	DanseFestival Barents, Hammerfest, Norway	70°39′45″N 23°41′00″E
Outdoor music festival	Midnattsrocken, Lakselv, Norway	70°03′04″N 24°58′18″E
Art festival	Barents Spektakel, Sør-Varanger Municipality, Norway	69.726536°N 30.040090°E
Professional theatre	Samovarteateret, Kirkenes, Norway	69.723740°N 30.057177°E
Tango club	Tango Polar, Tromsø, Norway	69.652299°N 18.962599°E
Regional theatre	Hålogaland Teater, Tromsø, Norway	69.642188°N 18.944700°E
Heavy Metal Music Festival	Iskald, Alta, Norway	69°58′07″N 23°16′17″E
Soul and Blues Festival	Alta Soul & Blues Festival, Alta, Norway	69°56′N 23°18′E
Animation studio	Fabelfjord, Tromsø, Norway	69°38′50″N 18°57′20″E
Lindy Hop dance group	Tromsø Lindy Hop, Tromsø, Norway	69°38′50″N 18°57′20″E
Stand-up comedy club	Stand Up Nord, Tromsø, Norway	69°38′50″N 18°57′20″E
Stunt company	Arctic Action AS, Tromsø, Norway	69°38′50″N 18°57′20″E
Symphony orchestra	Norwegian Arctic Philharmonic Orchestra, based in both Tromsø (more northerly) and Bodø, Norway	69°38′50″N 18°57′20″E
NAF Blood Bowl Tournament	da Keffo Kup, Setermoen, Bardu Municipality, Norway	68°54′16″N 18°24′01″E
Country music Festival	Hålogaland Country Festival, Harstad, Norway	68°48′00″N 16°32′45″E
Military band	Military band of Northern Norway, Harstad, Norway	68°48′00″N 16°32′45″E
Doll museum	Lofoten Toy Museum, Sakrisøy, Reine, Norway	67.941335°N 13.111239°E
Folk dance theatre	Rimpparemmi, Rovaniemi, Finland	66.499621°N 25.713644°E
Design week	Arctic Design, Rovaniemi, Finland	66°30′N 25°44′E
Light festival	Polar Night Light Festival, Rukatunturi, Kuusamo, Finland	66°11′46″N 29°06′45″E
Comics Festival	Kemi International Comics Festival, Kemi, Finland	65°44′N 24°33′E
Barbershop choir	Lule Barbershop Singers, Luleå, Sweden	65.583977°N 22.151046°E
Shakespeare theatre	Fairbanks Shakespeare Theatre, Fairbanks, Alaska, United States	64.843142°N 147.719628°W
Crime fiction festival	Iceland Noir, Reykjavík, Iceland	64°08′00″N 21°56′00″W
Samba dance group	Samba el Gambo, Kokkola, Finland	63.837039°N 23.103583°E
Opera house	Norrlandsoperan, Umeå, Sweden	63.827880°N 20.268853°E
Ukulele festival	Tropical Winter Ukulele Fest, Leppävirta, Finland	62°29′30″N 27°47′15″E
4DX cinema	Cinema Park, Surgut City Mall, Surgut, Russia	61°15′N 73°26′E
Sea shanty festival	Baltic Shanty Festival, Mariehamn, Åland, Finland	60°5′55″N 19°56′40″E
Amphitheatre	Saint Petersburg, Russia	59°56′N 30°20′E

=== Sport ===
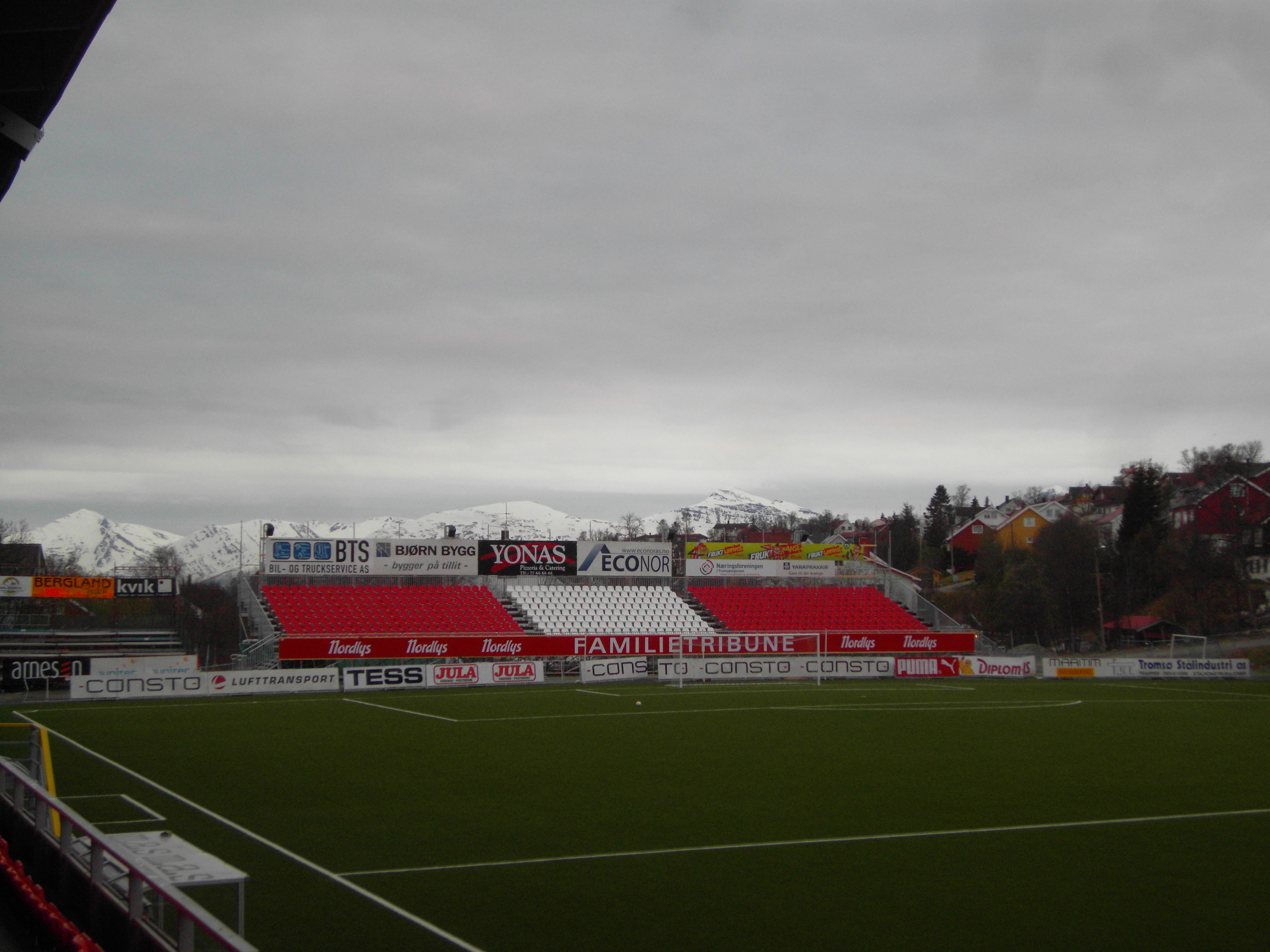
Alfheim Stadion, Tromsø, Norway

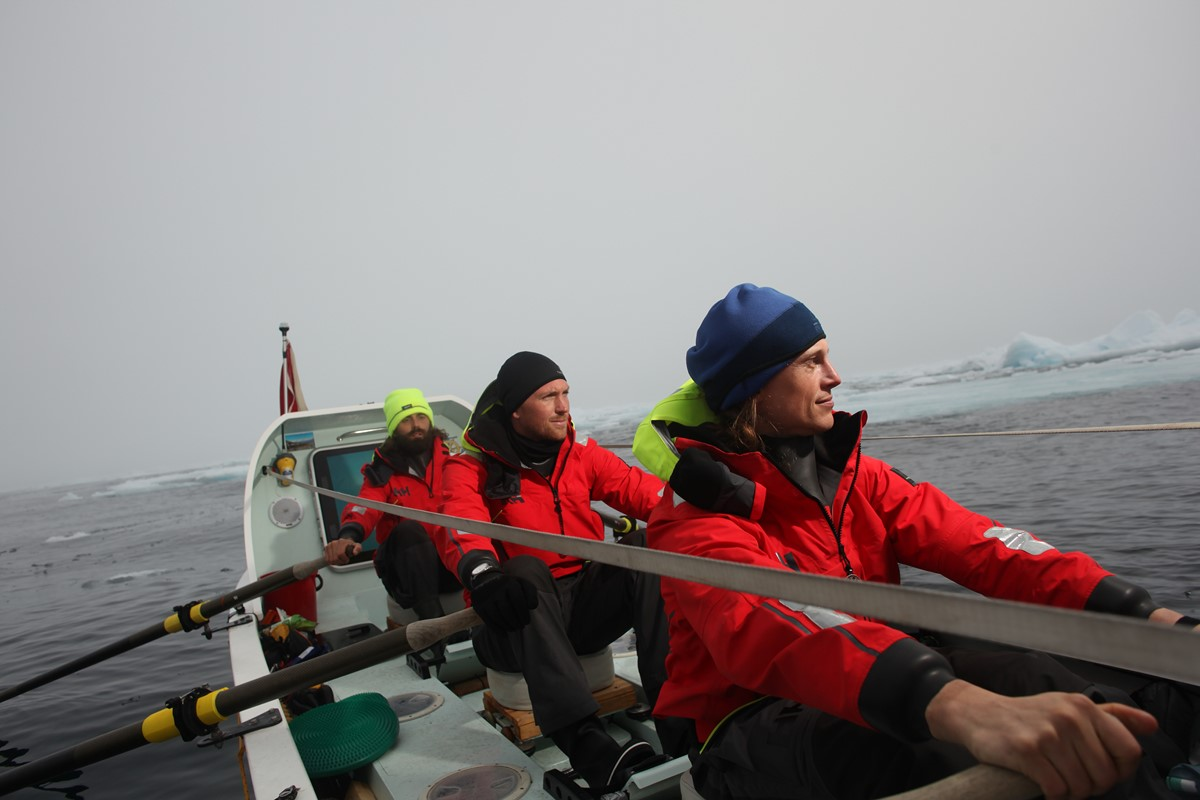
Fiann Paul, Alex Gregory, and Carlo Facchino made the northernmost latitude record by rowing.

Category	Place	Latitude/longitude
Ocean Rowing expedition	Polar Row led by Fiann Paul	79.56°N 10.23°E
Cycling sport	Arctic Race of Norway, Longyearbyen, Norway	78°13′N 15°37′E
Fell running	Platåfjellet, Svalbard, Norway	78°13′N 15°37′E
Judo club	Longyearbyen, Norway	78°13′N 15°37′E
Marathon running race	Spitsbergen Marathon, Longyearbyen, Norway	78°13′N 15°37′E
Marathon ski race	Svalbard Skimaraton, Longyearbyen, Norway	78°13′N 15°37′E
Swimming pool, at least 20 metres (66 ft)	Longyearbyen, Norway	78°12′38″N 15°36′49″E
Gym	Longyearbyen, Norway	78°12′38″N 15°36′49″E
Football school	Qaanaaq, Greenland, Denmark	77°27′48″N 69°10′37″W
Taekwondo club	Qaanaaq, Greenland, Denmark	77°28′00″N 69°13′50″W
American football field	Utqiaġvik, Alaska, United States	71°19′56″N 156°39′45″W
High school American football team	Utqiaġvik, Alaska, United States	71°17′N 156°45′W
Football (soccer) field	Qaanaaq, Greenland	77°27′48″N 69°10′37″W
Artificial turf	Honningsvåg gym, Honningsvåg, Norway	70.976459°N 25.979430°E
Beach volleyball field	Qaanaaq, Greenland	77°27′56″N 69°14′30″W
Diving school	Kongsfjord International Scuba School, Kongsfjord, Berlevåg Municipality, Norway	70.719637°N 29.321841°E
Nine-hole golf course	Ulukhaktok, Northwest Territories, Canada	70°44′N 117°45′W
Skatepark	Alta, Norway	70°2′5″N 23°32′9″E
Sled dog marathon	Finnmarksløpet, Alta, Norway	70°2′5″N 23°32′9″E
Climbing park	Sarves, Alta, Norway	69.972232°N 23.368176°E
Outdoor swimming pool	Skittenelv Camping, Krokelvdalen, Tromsø Municipality Norway	69.777468°N 19.382298°E
Ice hockey club	Kirkenes Puckers, Kirkenes, Norway	69°43′37″N 30°02′44″E
Squash centre	Tromsø Golf and Squash park, Tromsø, Norway	69.695476°N 19.013426°E
CrossFit center	CrossFit Tromsø, Tromsø, Norway	69.660435°N 18.964001°E
Floorball elite league	Tromsø Floorball Club, Tromsø, Norway	69.658155°N 18.964791°E
Kung fu club	Hung Kuen, Tromsø, Norway	69.652577°N 18.962951°E
Football arena	Alfheim Stadium, Tromsø, Norway	69.648916°N 18.934309°E
Football elite league	Tromsø Idrettslag, Tromsø, Norway	69.648884°N 18.935547°E
Ice skating rink	Tromsdalen kunstisbane, Tromsdalen, Tromsø, Norway	69.645814°N 19.019548°E
Aikido club	Aikido Reimeikan, Tromsø, Norway	69°40′N 19°04′E
Curling club	Boet curlingklubb, Tromsø, Norway	69°40′N 19°04′E
Ski resort	Tromsø Municipality, Norway^{Also self claimed}	69°40′N 19°04′E
18 hole golf course	Tromsø Golfpark at Breivikeidet near Tromsø, Norway	69°39′30″N 19°37′00″E
Parachute association	Tromsø Parachute Association, Tromsø, Norway	69°37′07″N 18°57′12″E
Ice arena	Taymyr, Dudinka, Russia	69°24′N 86°11′E (coordinates of Dudinka)
Sailing regatta	Severomorsk, Russia	69°04′N 33°25′E (coordinates of Severomorsk)
Drag racing rail	Arctic Raceway AS, Elvenes, Salangen Municipality, Norway	68.870959°N 17.983686°E
Harness racing track	Harstad Travpark, Harstad, Norway	68.789046°N 16.459734°E
Disc golf course	Ivalon Frisbeegolfrata, Ivalo, Inari, Finland	68.684169°N 27.502706°E
Links-styled golf course	Lofoten Links, Gimsøysand, Lofoten, Norway	68.340377°N 14.128495°E
Surfing competition	Lofoten Masters, Bøstad, Norway	68.265272°N 13.591308°E
Downhill mountain biking track	Levi, Ylläs, Kolari, Finland	67.806001°N 24.798537°E
Steeplechase race	Arctic Challenge, Levi, Ylläs, Kolari, Finland	67.805°N 24.802°E
Hot yoga studio	Kuru Yoga, Levi Hotel Spa, Levi, Ylläs, Kolari, Finland	67.803832°N 24.800942°E
Triathlon school	Levi, Ylläs, Kolari, Finland	67.805°N 24.802°E
Triathlon	Lofoten Triathlon, Svolvær, Norway	68°13′56″N 14°33′55″E
Yoga Festival	Arctic Yoga Conference, Bodø, Norway	67°16′N 14°24′E
Race track	Arctic Circle Raceway, Mo i Rana, Norway	66.423574°N 14.444912°E
Footgolf course	Helgeland Golfklubb, Helgeland, Norway	65.926646°N 13.310752°E
27 hole golf course	Luleå Golfklubb, Luleå, Sweden	65.683325°N 22.090118°E
Ice hockey elite league	Luleå Hockey, Luleå, Sweden	65.597812°N 22.148316°E
Padel field	Padel 365, Luleå, Sweden	65.597177°N 22.143614°E
Kendo society	Kendo Society of Tornio, Tornio, Finland	65°51′N 24°09′E
36 hole golf course	Piteå Golfklubb, Piteå, Sweden	65.317513°N 21.528037°E
Cable wakeboard line	Oulu Wakepark Oy, Oulu, Finland	65.011311°N 25.476684°E
Disc golf competition	Naamivaara Open, Oulu, Finland	65°01′N 025°28′E
Gaelic Athletic Association club	Oulu Irish Elks, Oulu, Finland	65°01′N 25°28′E
Lido	Otanmäki Lido, Otanmäki, Kajaani, Finland	64.107894°N 27.102595°E
Cricket field	Iceland Cricket Ground, Víðistaðatún, Hafnarfjörður, Iceland	64.074897°N 21.9636155°W
Indoor surfing area	Radisson Blu Resort Trysil, Trysil Municipality, Norway	61.307787°N 12.244302°E
Cricket club	Oulu Cricket Club Oulu, Finland	65°01′N 025°28′E
Ski jumping hill	Grønnåsen hoppbakke, Tromsø, Norway	69˚69N 018˚96E
Ski jumping hill with plastic matting for year round jumping	Grønnåsen hoppbakke, K6, K15 and K45, Tromsø, Norway	69˚69N 018˚96E

== Religious structures ==
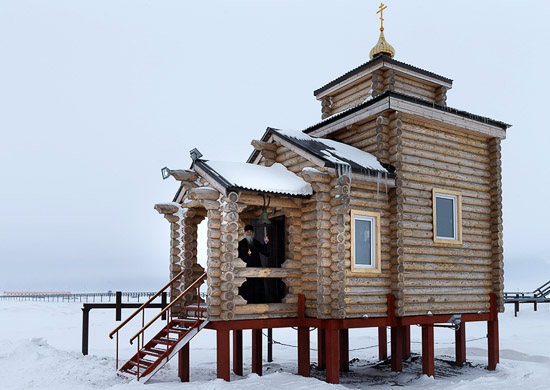
Church of St. Nicholas the Miracle Worker, Franz Josef Land, Russia

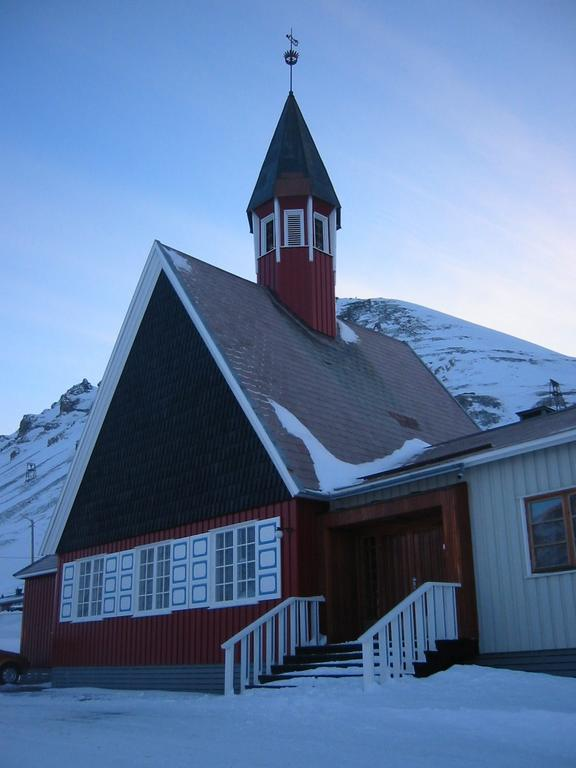
Svalbard Church, Svalbard

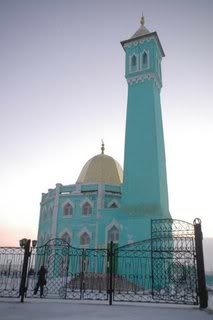
Nord Kamal Mosque, Norilsk, Russia

Category	Place	Latitude/longitude
Church (Eastern Orthodox Church) (military church)	Church of St. Nicholas the Miracle Worker, Alexandra Land, Franz Josef Land, Arkhangelsk Oblast, Russia	80°48′0″N 047°44′0″E
Lutheran confirmation	Longyearbyen, Svalbard, Norway	78.22°N 15.65°E
Church (Lutheran church) (civilian church)	Svalbard church, Longyearbyen, Svalbard, Norway	78.219831°N 15.618314°E
Haziratu'l-Quds (a.k.a. Baháʼí Faith Centre)	Haziratu'l-Quds established prior to 1957 in Qaanaaq, Greenland, Denmark	77.467178°N 69.230046°W (coordinates of Qaanaaq)
Anglican church	St Peter's Church, Grise Fiord, Nunavut, Canada	76.2503°N 82.5338°W (coordinates of Grise Fiord)
Eastern Orthodox Church (civilian)	Church of Saint Nicholas, Dikson, Russia	73°30′N 80°31′E
Catholic church	Church of the Sacred Heart of Jesus, Pond Inlet, Nunavut, Canada	72.695411°N 77.978643°W
Latter-day Saint church	Boxer Chapel, Utqiaġvik, Alaska, United States	71.301133°N 156.761766°W
Seventh-day Adventist Church	Barrow SDA Church, Utqiaġvik, Alaska, United States	71.300871°N 156.734236°W
Presbyterian church	Utqiagvik Presbyterian Church in Utqiaġvik, Alaska, United States	71.292347°N 156.783979°W
Assemblies of God church	Inupiat Assembly of God, Utqiaġvik, Alaska, United States	71.290839°N 156.788271°W
Baptist church	Calvary Bible Baptist Church, Utqiaġvik, Alaska, United States	71.288602°N 156.783176°W
Pilgrimage church	Skarsvåg Church, Skarsvåg, Norway	71.109886°N 25.817709°E
Methodist church	Metodistkirken in Hammerfest, Norway	70.662038°N 23.681323°W
Kingdom Hall of Jehovah's Witnesses	Rikets sal, Rypklubbveien, Hammerfest, Norway	70.648750°N 23.662830°E
Clergy house	Måsøy Municipality, Norway	70°59′48″N 24°39′40″E (coordinates of Måsøy)
Ecumenic chapel	St. Johannes kapell, Nordkapp Municipality, Norway	70°58′41″N 25°58′29″E (coordinates of Nordkapp)
Salvation Army Guesthouse	Frelsesarmeen Vardø korps, Vardø, Norway	70.370278°N 31.110824°E
Deaf ministry	Tromsø, Norway	69.680827°N 19.062824°E
Cathedral	Vår Frue Church, Tromsø, Norway	69.651600°N 18.956762°E
Bible school	Fjellheim Bible School, Tromsø, Norway	69.638686°N 18.930836°E
Mosque	Alnor Senter, Tromsø, Norway	69°39′15.01″N 18°57′36.25″E
Mosque Custom Built	Nurd Kamal Mosque, Norilsk, Russia	69°20′27.19″N 88°12′3.21″E
New Apostolic Church	Murmansk, Russia	68.955445°N 33.067698°E
Medieval church	Trondenes Church, Norway	68.8220°N 16.5622°E
Jewish community	Murmansk, Russia	68°58′N 33°05′E
Eckankar temple	Inuvik, Northwest Territories, Canada	68.35°N 133.42°W (coordinates of Inuvik)
Buddhist temple and monastery	Fredens hus, Boden, Sweden	65°50′N 21°43′E
Quaker meeting house	Hidden Hill Friends Center, Fairbanks, Alaska, United States	64.862089°N 147.917513°W
Synagogue (Reform)	Fairbanks, Alaska, United States	64.860015°N 147.762711°W
Unitarian Universalist church	Unitarian Universalist Church, Fairbanks, Alaska, United States	64.835057°N 147.847183°W
Wicca coven, group or organisation	Fairbanks & North Pole Pagan Wives, Fairbanks, Alaska, United States	64°50′37″N 147°43′23″W (coordinates of Fairbanks)
Christian Community Church	Kristensamfunnet Trøndelag, Trøndelag, Norway	63.432224°N 10.392182°E
Gothic cathedral	Nidaros Cathedral, Trondheim, Norway	63.426905°N 10.396948°E
Orthodox Jewish synagogue	Trondheim, Norway	63.426381°N 10.392931°E
Pilgrimage route	St. Olavsleden, Selånger-Trondheim	63°25′37″N 10°23′35″E
Armenian church	Saint Karapet, Yakutsk, Sakha, Russia	62.03°N 129.73°E
Buddhist datsan	Lotus, Yakutsk, Sakha, Russia	62.03°N 129.73°E (coordinates of Yakutsk)
Buddhist stupa	Siikainen stupa, Siikainen, Finland	61.915016°N 21.925590°E
Hindu temple	Sri Ganesha Hindu temple, Anchorage, Alaska, United States	61.179746°N 149.961920°W
Taoist center	Taoism Center for Wellness, Anchorage, Alaska, United States	61.173643°N 149.887990°W
Mennonite church	Prince of Peace Mennonite Church, Anchorage, Alaska, United States	61.121434°N 149.748460°W
Sikh Gurudwara	The Sikh Society of Alaska, Anchorage, Alaska, United States	61.114961°N 149.743202°W
Mormon temple	Anchorage Alaska Temple, Anchorage, Alaska, United States	61.101651°N 149.840289°W
Hare Krishna temple	Malmi Manor, Malmi, Helsinki, Finland	60.2510°N 25.0106°E
Metropolitan Community Church	Elävä vesi MCC, Helsinki, Finland	60°10′15″N 24°56′15″E (coordinates of Helsinki)
Liberal Catholic Church	Church of Saint Michel and all Angels, Stockholm, Sweden	59.322198°N 17.994805°E
Coptic Church	St. Mary & St. Paul Coptic Orthodox Church, Stockholm, Sweden	59.303355°N 18.007904°E
Scientology church	Scientologi-kyrkan, Stockholm, Sweden	59.264422°N 17.903386°E
Hutterian church	Hutterian Brethren Church, Eaglesham, Alberta, Canada	55.726205°N 117.961783°W
Ancient Roman temple	Maryport, England, United Kingdom	54.7128°N 3.4926°W (coordinates of Maryport)
Christian Science church	First Church of Christ, Scientist, Anchorage, Alaska, United States	61.2078°N 149.9038°W
Jain temple	Jain Samaj, Manchester, United Kingdom	53.450945°N 2.192403°W
Shinto shrine	Japanese Dutch Shinzen Foundation, Amsterdam, Netherlands	52.373217°N 4.924987°E
Amish community	Rexford community in Rexford, Montana, United States	48.53°N 115.10°W (coordinates of Rexford, Montana)
Zoroastrian fire temple (defunct)	Archaeological remains of a fire temple in Tbilisi, Georgia	41.43°N 44.47°E (coordinates of Tbilisi)
Zoroastrian fire temple (active)	Fire Temple of Yazd in Yazd, Iran	31.905556°N 54.339167°E

=== Monasteries, religious orders and institutions ===
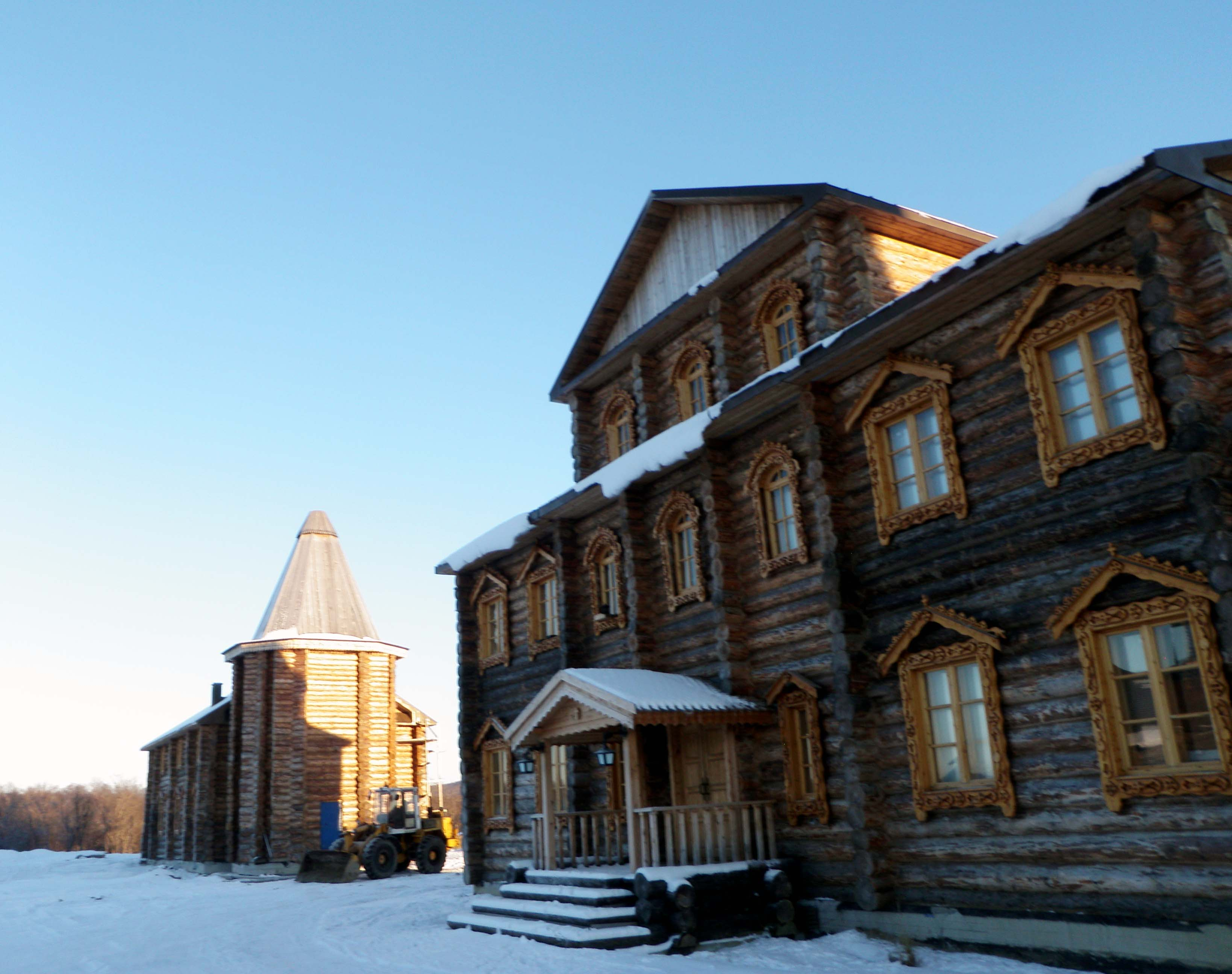
Pechenga Monastery, Murmanskaya, Russia

Category	Place	Latitude/longitude
Nunnery	Carmelite Nunnery Totus Tuus, Tromsø, Norway	69.652566°N 18.920829°E
Monastery	Pechenga Monastery, Pechenga, Murmanskaya, Russia	69.544630°N 31.213128°E
Cistercian monastery	Munkeby Abbey, Levanger, Norway	63.718849°N 11.379240°E
Ursuline convent	Jyväskylä, Finland	62.248036°N 25.747783°E
Society of Jesus Center	Jesuiterna i Uppsala, Uppsala, Sweden	59.858137°N 17.626251°E
Opus Dei center	Stockholm, Sweden	59.345918°N 18.068887°E
Poor Clares monastery	Høysteinane kloster, Larvik Municipality, Norway	59.048687°N 9.991635°E
Benedictine monastery	Heliga Hjärtas Kloster, Borghamn, Sweden	58.355735°N 14.694448°E
Augustinian monastery or parish	St Joseph's Parish, Edinburgh, Scotland	55.928664°N 3.279975°W
Carthusian monastery	St. Hugh's Charterhouse, Horsham, England, United Kingdom	50.972987°N 0.282668°W

== Transportation ==
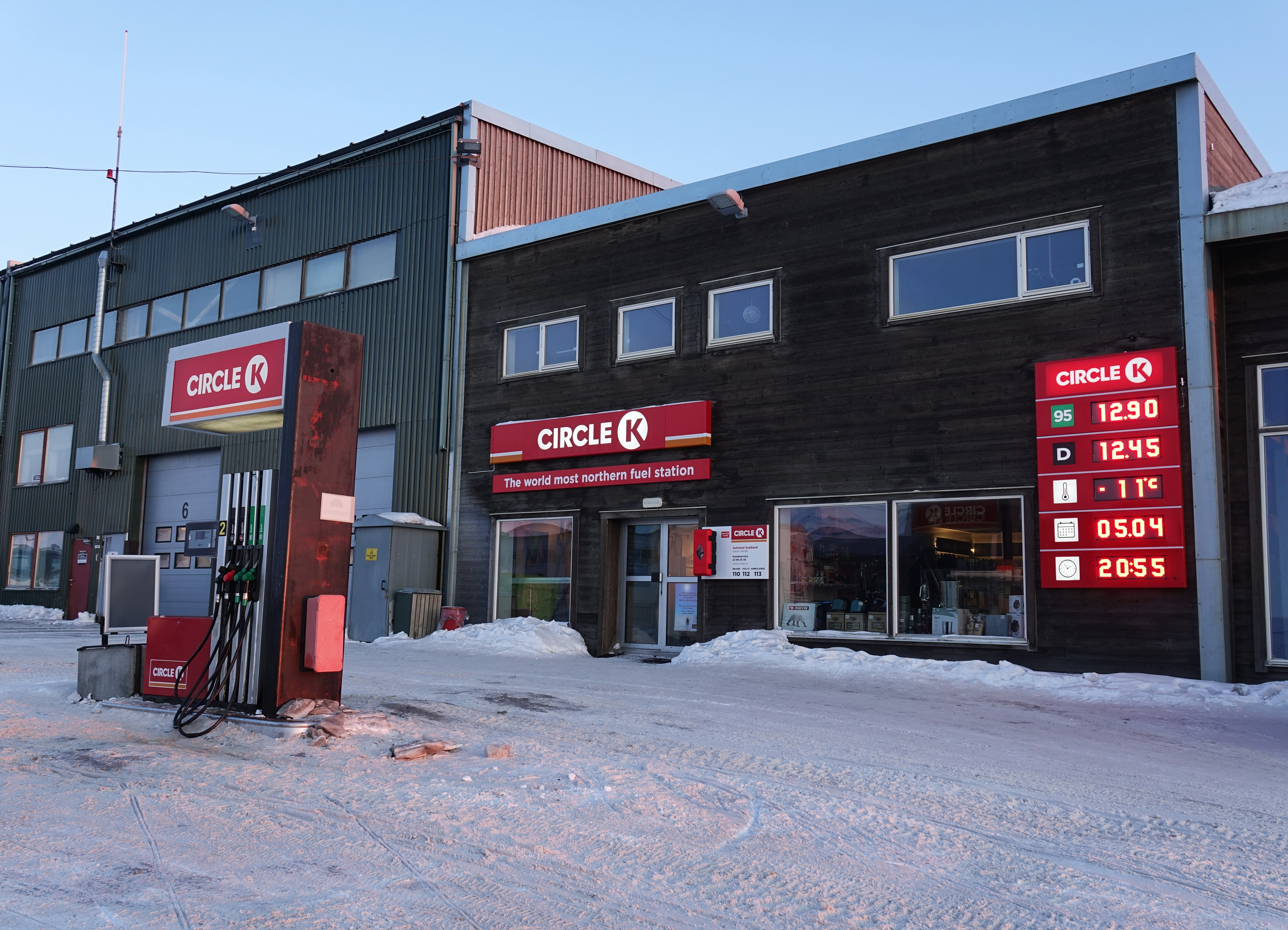
Circle K gas station, Longyearbyen, Svalbard

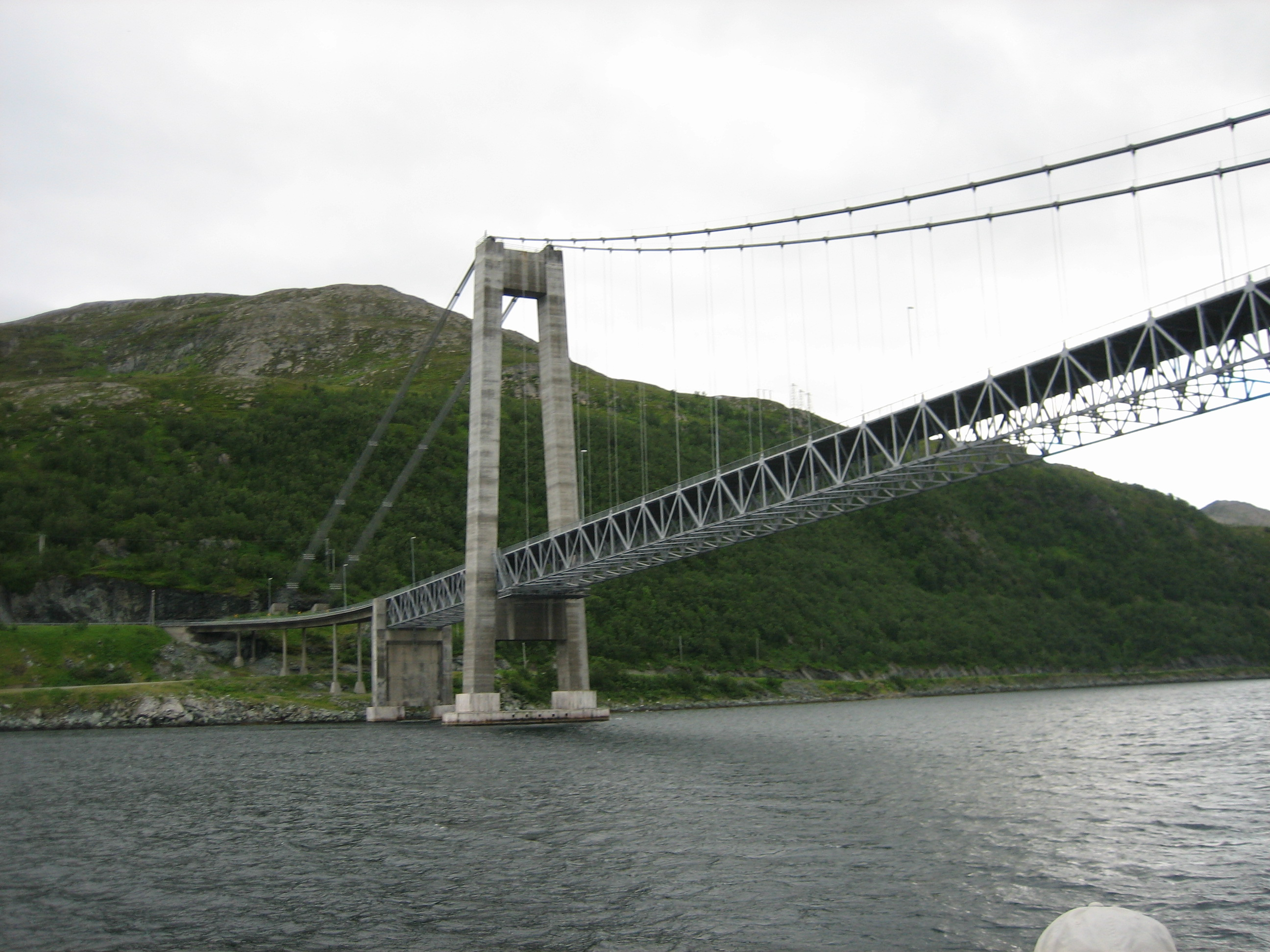
Kvalsund Bridge, Kvalsund, Norway

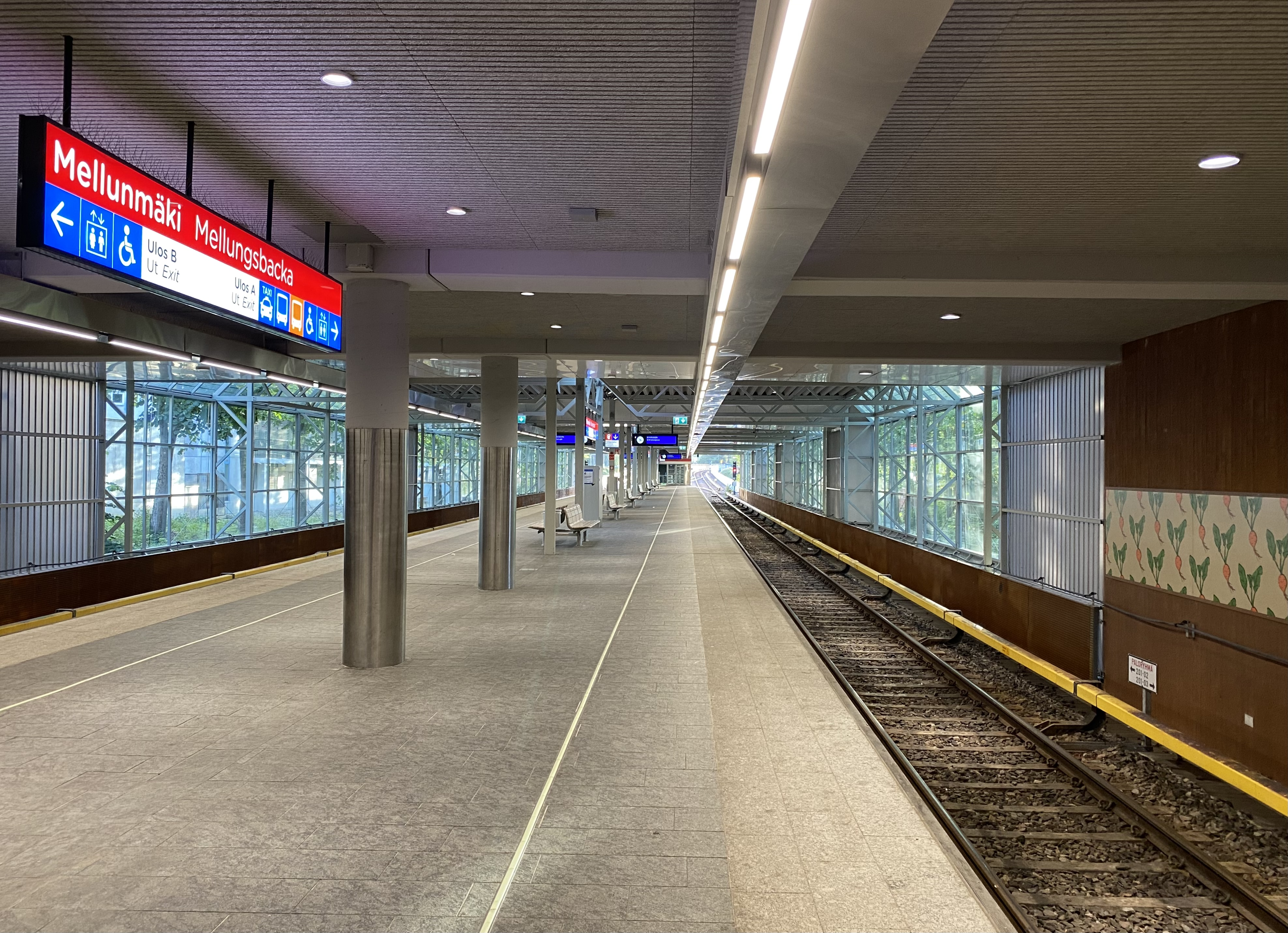
Mellunmäki metro station, Helsinki, Finland

Category	Place	Latitude/longitude
Unscheduled airport	Alert Airport, Nunavut, Canada	82°31′04″N 062°16′50″W
Locomotive	Ny-Ålesund, Svalbard, Norway	78°55′N 11°56′E
Asphalt concrete	Longyearbyen, Svalbard, Norway	78.22°N 15.65°E
Bicycle-sharing system	Longyearbyen Svalbard, Norway	78.22°N 15.65°E
Bus station	Longyearbyen, Svalbard, Norway	78.22°N 15.65°E
Car rental	Arctic Autorent AS, Svalbard, Norway	78.22°N 15.65°E
Cargo route	MS Norbjørn, Tromsø – Longyearbyen, Norway	78.22°N 15.65°E
Harbor	Longyearbyen Harbor, Longyearbyen, Svalbard, Norway	78.22°N 15.65°E
Gas station	Circle K, Longyearbyen, Svalbard, Norway	78.22°N 15.65°E
Limousine	Svalbards Limousineservice, Svalbard, Norway	78.22°N 15.65°E
Roundabout	Ingøy, Måsøy Municipality, Norway planned: Longyearbyen, Svalbard, Norway	71.0846°N 24.0583°E; 78.22°N 15.65°E
Taxi rank	Longyearbyen, Svalbard, Norway	78.22°N 15.65°E
Permanent airport with scheduled flights	Svalbard Longyear Airport, Svalbard, Norway	78°14′46″N 15°27′56″E
Helicopter route	Qaanaaq-Siorapaluk Svalbard has non-public helicopter routes	77°47′11″N 70°38′18″W
Bridge	Grise Fiord, Nunavut, Canada	76°25′8″N 82°54′14″W
Road	road to Anabar, Anabar Bay, Yuryung-Khaya, Russia	72°N 49°E
Trail	Knivskjellodden, Norway	71°11′08″N 25°40′54″E
Ice-free year-round port	Skarsvåg, Norway	71°06′47″N 25°49′37″E
Crosswalk	Mehamn, Norway	71.039834°N 27.851080°E
Electric vehicle charging station	Havøysund, Norway; Mehamn, Norway	70.996445°N 24.661338°E; 71.038242°N 27.850586°E
Road tunnel	Honningsvågtunnelen, Honningsvåg, Norway	70°59′06″N 25°52′14″E
Suspension bridge	Kvalsund Bridge, Kvalsund (village), Norway	70.513365°N 23.950736°E
Railway	Obskaya–Bovanenkovo Line, Russia	70.326279°N 68.8269613°E
Railway station	Karskaya station, Russia	70.3167369°N 68.3914162°E
Pedestrian zone	Markedsgata, Alta, Norway	69.966571°N 23.273834°E
Aviation school	School of Aviation, University of Tromsø, Tromsø, Norway	69.679784°N 18.970965°E
Traffic light	Tromsø, Norway	69.673998°N 18.976735°E
Main road	E69, North Cape, Norway Northwestern E105, Murmansk-Kirkenes	71°10′7″N 25°46′58″E; 69°43′37″N 30°02′4″E
Biodiesel fueling station	Skattøra, Tromsø, Norway	69°39′07″N 18°57′12″E
Trolleybus	Murmansk, Russia	68.9690°N 33.0788°E
Electrified railway	Kirov Railway, Murmansk-Saint Petersburg, Russia	68°57′57″N 33°03′45″E
Motorway	Tornio–Kemi, Finland (road 29/E8)	65°50′N 24°20′E
Blue Flag marina	Uleninranta, Kemi, Finland	65°44′10″N 24°33′50″E
Motorway interchange	traffic place Notviken, Luleå, Sweden	65.624169°N 22.059144°E
Motorway interchange	traffic place Murmansk, Russia	68.87595388850528°N 33.12543081187984°E
Moveable bridge	Bergnäsbron, Luleå, Sweden	65°34′42″N 22°7′42″E
Year-round ship route	Vaasa-Umeå (large car ferry), Hurtigruten at Cape Nordkinn (passenger ship)	63.681807°N 20.340990°E 71.1347°N 27.6552°E
Tram	Trondheim, Norway	63.625°N 10.383°E
Underground railway station	Helsinki Airport railway station, Vantaa, Finland	60°19′02″N 24°58′12″E
Metro station	Mellunmäki metro station, Helsinki, Finland (Helsinki Metro)	60°14′21″N 25°6′39″E
Monorail	Moscow Monorail, Moscow, Russia	55°50′07″N 37°19′36″E

== Shops and service facilities ==
=== General ===
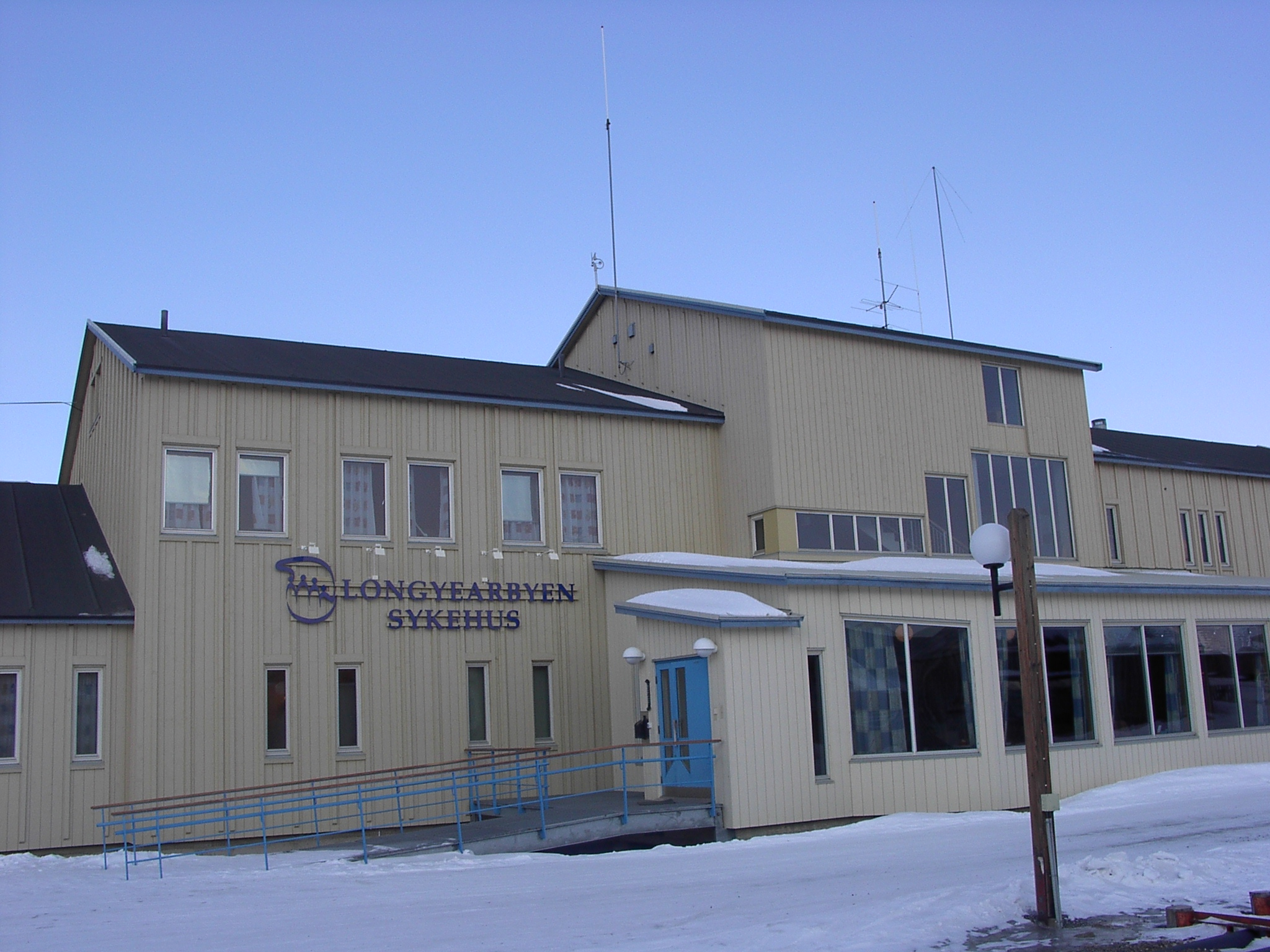
Longyearbyen Hospital, Svalbard

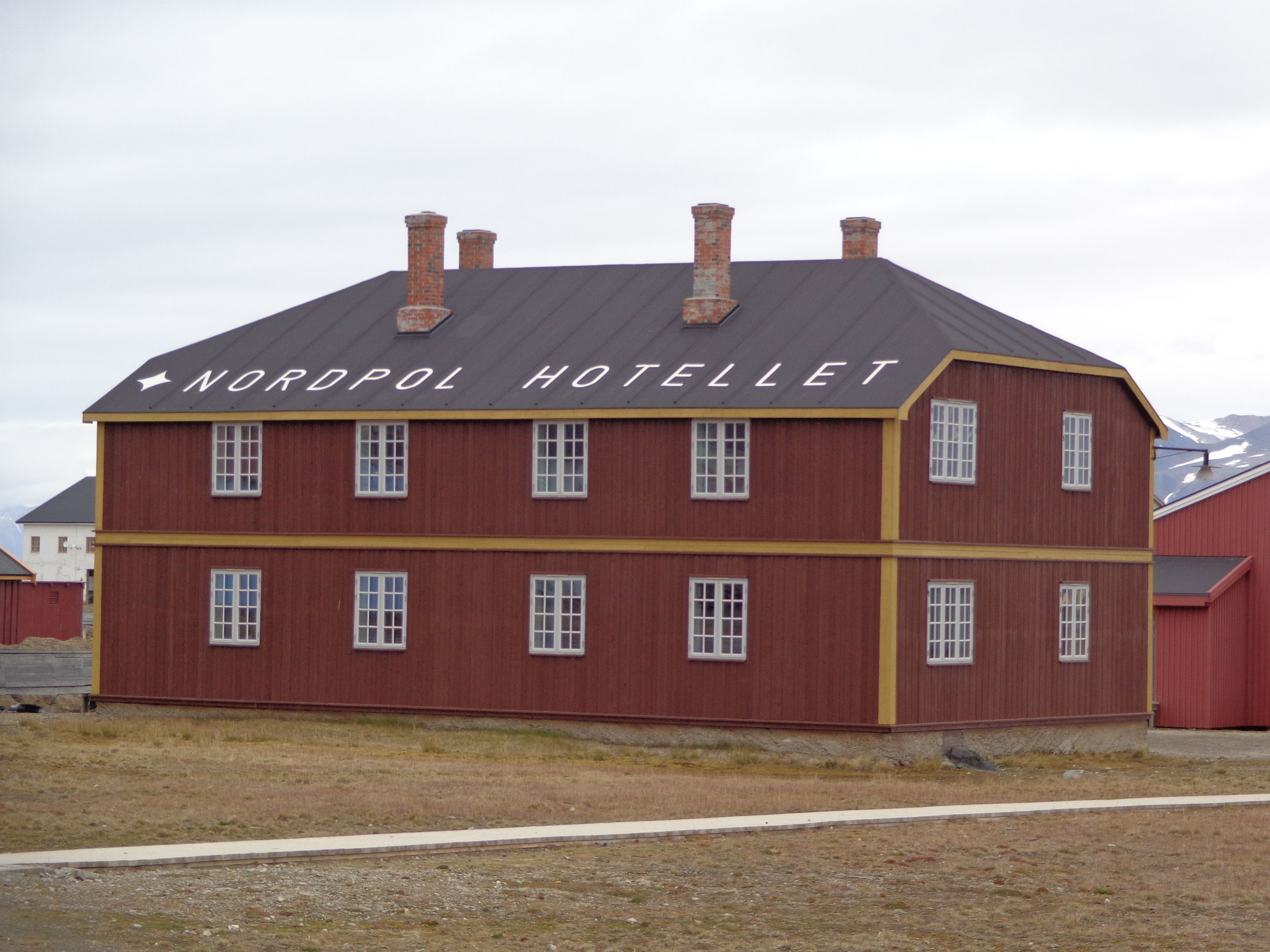
Nordpol hotel, Ny-Ålesund, Svalbard, Norway

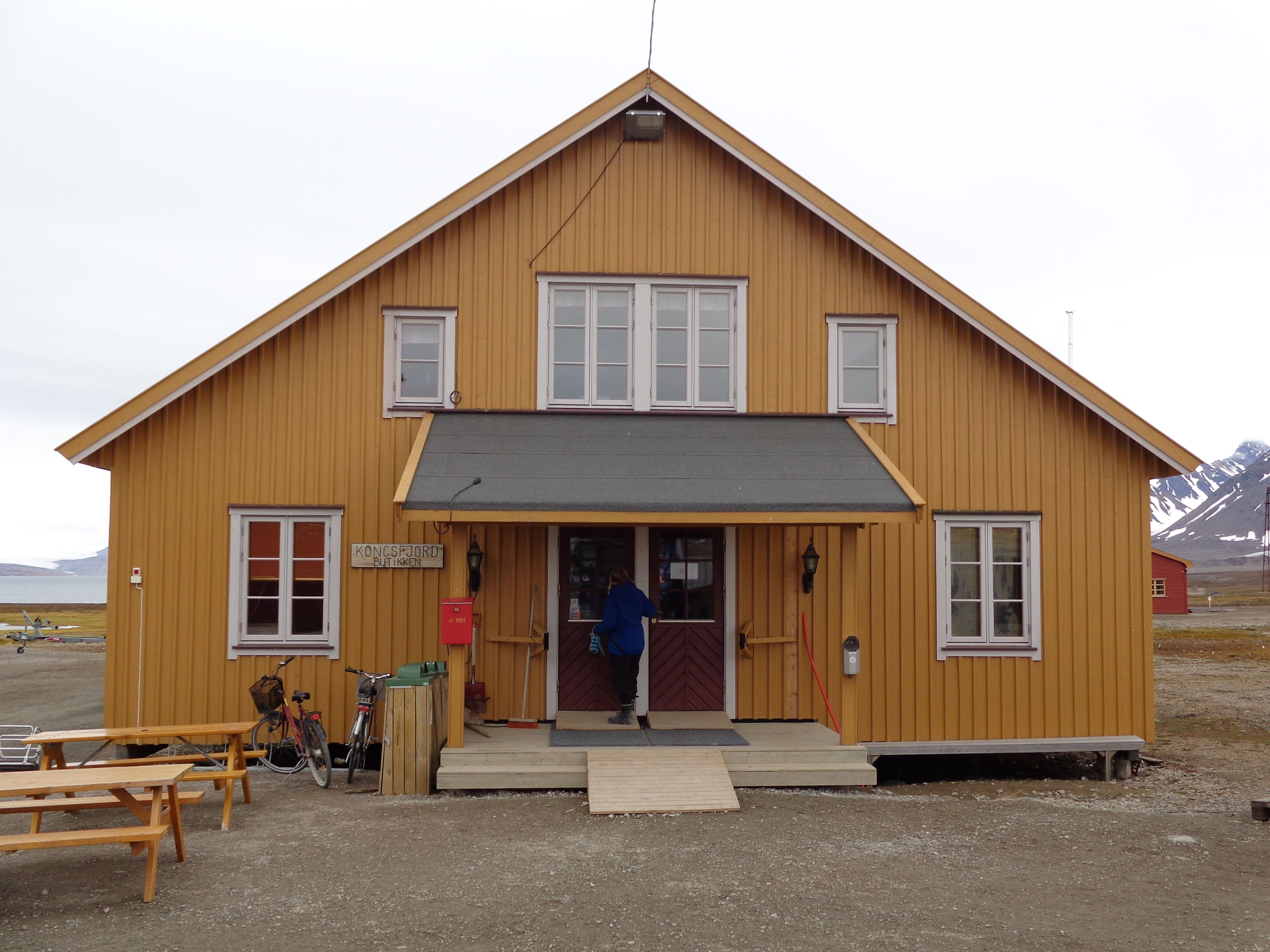
Kongsfjordbutikken, Ny-Ålesund, Svalbard, Norway

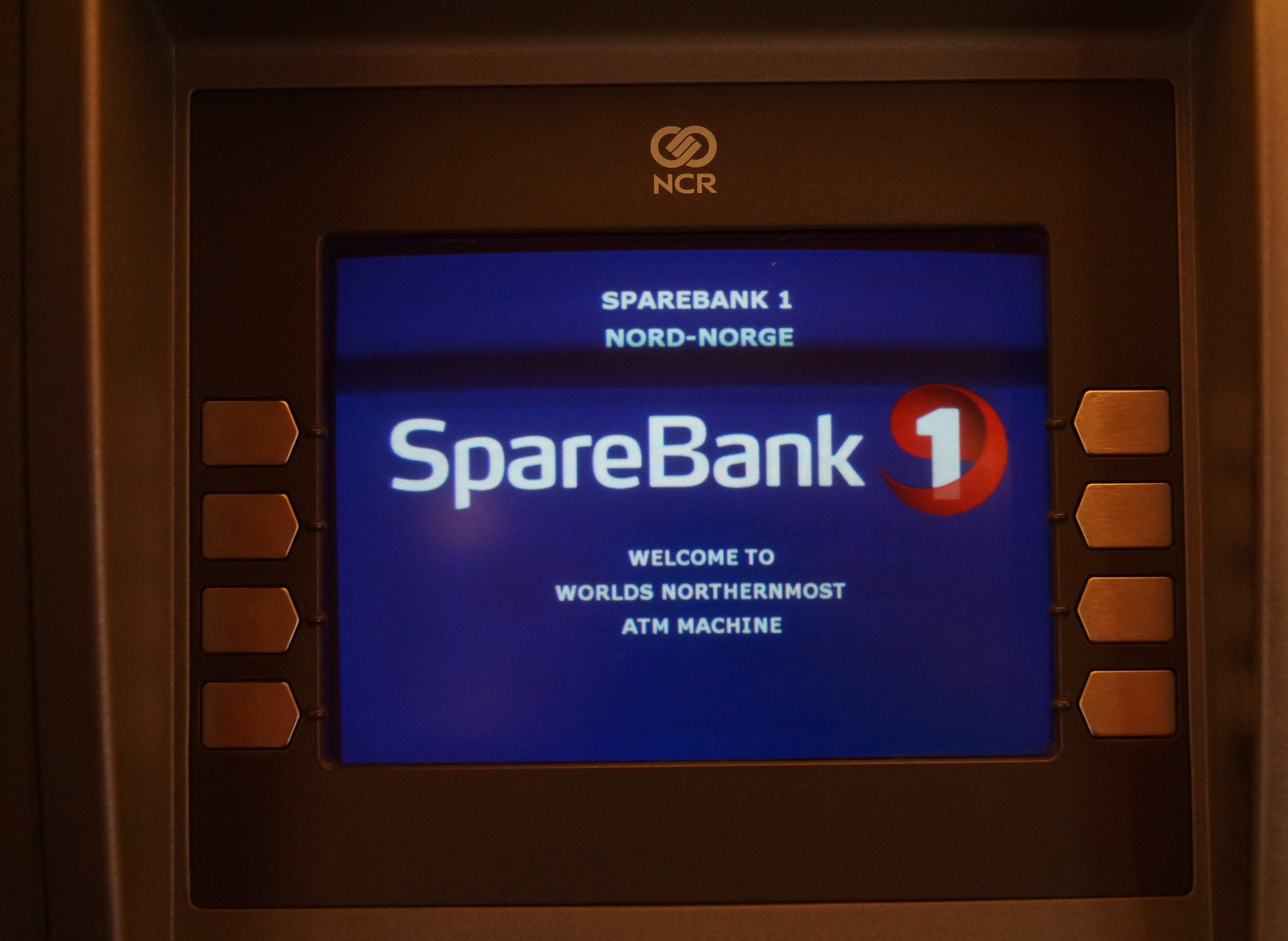
A SpareBank 1 Nord-Norge ATM in Longyearbyen, Svalbard

Category	Place	Latitude/longitude
Post office (military)	CFS Alert, (Alert) Nunavut, Canada	82°30′N 062°19′E
Post office (civilian)	Ny-Ålesund, Svalbard, Norway	78°55′N 11°56′E
Hotel	Nordpol hotel, Ny-Ålesund, Svalbard, Norway	78°55′N 11°56′E
Store	Kongsfjordbutikken, Ny-Ålesund, Svalbard, Norway	78°55′N 11°56′E
Bakery	Rabalder café & bakery, Longyearbyen, Svalbard, Norway	78.22°N 15.65°E
Bookstore	Uroens bokhandel, Longyearbyen, Svalbard, Norway	78.22°N 15.65°E
Call centre	Svalcom, Longyearbyen, Svalbard, Norway	78.22°N 15.65°E
Children's clothing store	RaBis Bua, Longyearbyen, Svalbard, Norway	78.22°N 15.65°E
Commercially available cottage	Basecamp Nordensköld, Longyearbyen, Svalbard, Norway	78.22°N 15.65°E
Make-up studio	Longyearbyen, Svalbard, Norway	78.22°N 15.65°E
Massage	Longyearbyen, Svalbard, Norway	78.22°N 15.65°E
Plumbing company	Assemblin Spitsbergen, Longyearbyen, Svalbard, Norway	78.22°N 15.65°E
Police station	Longyearbyen, Svalbard, Norway	78.22°N 15.65°E
Shopping mall	Lompensenteret, Svalbardbutikken, Longyearbyen, Svalbard, Norway	78.22°N 15.65°E
Soft serve machine	Lompensenteret, Longyearbyen, Svalbard, Norway	78.22°N 15.65°E
Supermarket	Coop, Svalbardbutikken, Longyearbyen, Svalbard, Norway	78.22°N 15.65°E
Tourist office	Spitsbergen Travel, Longyearbyen, Svalbard, Norway	78.22°N 15.65°E
Veterinarian	Longyearbyen, Svalbard, Norway	78.22°N 15.65°E
Pharmacy	Apotek Spitsbergen, Longyearbyen, Svalbard, Norway	78.218327°N 15.639848°E
Fully-serviced hotel Four-star hotel	Radisson Blu Polar Hotel Spitsbergen, Longyearbyen, Longyearbyen, Svalbard, Norway	78.218327°N 15.639848°E
Toy store	Ringo, Longyearbyen, Svalbard, Norway	78.218129°N 15.640111°E
Library	Longyearbyen Public Library, Longyearbyen, Svalbard, Norway	78.217695°N 15.640905°E
Automated teller machine	Longyearbyen, Svalbard, Norway	78°13′N 15°33′E
Dentist	Longyearbyen Hospital, Longyearbyen, Svalbard, Norway	78°13′N 15°38′E
Hospital	Longyearbyen Hospital, Longyearbyen, Svalbard, Norway	78°13′N 15°38′E
Retirement home	Qaanaaq, Greenland, Denmark	77°28′00″N 69°13′50″W
Tanning salon	Dorothys Arctic Hair & Tanning Salon, Utqiaġvik, Alaska, United States	71°17′26″N 156°47′19″W
Retailer of snow mobiles and/or all-terrain vehicles	Ingeniør G. Paulsen, Longyearbyen, Norway	78.2229941°N 15.6628647°E
Hardware store	Byggtorget, Honningsvåg, Norway	70.998913°N 25.968087°E
Sporting goods retailer	Benihana sports, Honningsvåg, Norway	70.978941°N 25.976574°E
Maternity ward	Hammerfest Hospital, Hammerfest, Norway	70.672699°N 23.672355°E
Advertising agency	Reklamehuset Nord AS, Hammerfest, Norway	70.663008°N 23.686244°E
Motel	Hammerfest Motell, Hammerfest, Norway	70.653101°N 23.657494°E
Shopping street	Hammerfest, Norway	70°39′45″N 23°41′00″E
Ice cream van	Vadsø, Norway	70°04′24″N 29°44′59″E
Chiropractic clinic	Hammerfest, Norway	70.633955°N 23.684458°E
Record store	Puskas musikk, Alta, Norway	69.966399°N 23.271962°E
Plastic surgery clinic	Alta, Norway	69.966089°N 23.271080°E
Lighting store	Møbelringen Alta, Alta, Norway	69.964482°N 23.280396°E
Ice hotel	Igloo Hotel, Sorrisniva, Alta, Norway	69.865117°N 23.317985°E
Auction house	Linden Lück, Tromsø, Norway	69.802640°N 18.765300°E
Fertility clinic	University Hospital of North Norway Tromsø, Troms, Norway	69.682965°N 18.982489°E
Neurosurgical department	University Hospital of North Norway Tromsø, Troms, Norway	69.682965°N 18.982489°E
Psychiatric hospital	BUP Tromsø, Tromsø, Norway	69.670283°N 18.9529575°E
Antiquarian bookshop	Septentria, Tromsø, Norway	69.649445°N 18.957230°E
Skate shop	Badlands Skateshop, Tromsø, Norway	69.648162°N 18.956651°E
Zone therapy clinic	Isfoden, Ilulissat, Greenland	69°13′N 51°06′W
Give-away shop	Free Shop, Murmansk, Russia	68.928552°N 33.117733°E
Tropical spa	Holiday Club Saariselkä, Saariselkä, Inari, Finland	68.420344°N 27.418821°E
Surf shop	Unstad Arctic Surf, Unstad, Lofoten, Norway	68.265298°N 13.591381°E
Bookmobile	Överkalix-Gällivare (road E10), Sweden	67°8′N 20°39′E
Equine veterinarian	Rovaniemi Equine Clinic, Kemijärvi, Finland	66.969173°N 27.523019°E
Castle hotel	Balfour Castle, Shapinsay, Orkney, United Kingdom	59.031684°N 2.916767°W

=== Famous brand names ===
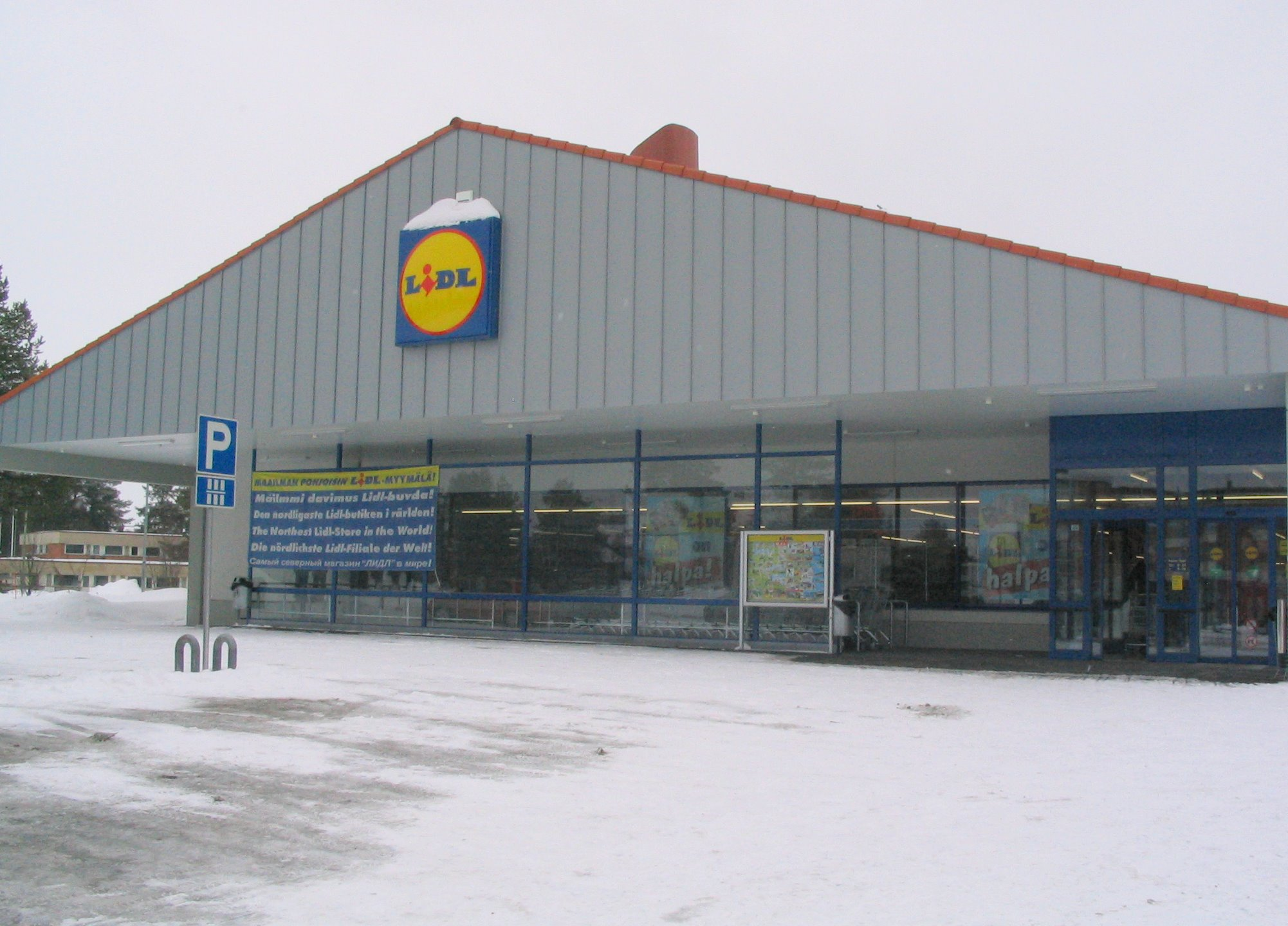
The world's northernmost Lidl in Sodankylä, Finland. The store has a sign telling others about it being the northernmost Lidl.

Brand	Place	Latitude/longitude
Airbnb room letting	Total Solar Eclipse, Longyearbyen, Svalbard, Norway	78.2461°N 15.4656°E
Circle K gas station	Longyearbyen, Svalbard, Norway	78.224300°N 15.633134°E
Spar	Berlevåg, Norway	70.859060°N 29.090568°E
ABB office	Hammerfest, Norway	70.664625°N 23.679266°E
Aveda Salon	Morten Dame og herrefrisør, Hammerfest, Norway	70.662889°N 23.687344°E
Esso gas station	Varangerbotn, Norway	70.173072°N 28.554786°E
H&M	Alta, Norway	69.965557°N 23.272191°E
Harley Davidson retailer	Tromsø, Norway	69.698060°N 19.015338°E
ECCO	Tromsø, Norway	69.674503°N 18.928403°E
The Body Shop	Tromsø, Norway	69.674496°N 18.928424°E
7-Eleven	Tromsø, Norway	69.651084°N 18.958610°E
Microsoft development office	Tromsø, Norway	69.648913°N 18.953400°E
Yves Rocher	Norilsk, Russia	69.347694°N 88.190598°E
Pull & Bear	Murmansk, Russia	68.956335°N 33.073460°E
Bershka	Murmansk, Russia	68.956603°N 33.070358°E
Stradivarius	Murmansk, Russia	68.956525°N 33.070513°E
Zara	Murmansk, Russia	68.956486°N 33.070603°E
Lidl	Sodankylä, Finland	67.414556°N 26.587675°E
IKEA	Haparanda, Sweden	65.843386°N 24.132055°E
Esprit	Kempele, Finland	64.902361°N 25.537364°E
GameStop	Fairbanks, Alaska, United States	64.856904°N 147.700035°W
Walmart	Fairbanks, Alaska, United States	64.856611°N 147.689553°W
Costco	Fairbanks, Alaska, United States	64.852991°N 147.708157°W
Shell gas station	Fairbanks, Alaska, United States	64.852490°N 147.750394°W
Target	Wasilla, Alaska, United States	61.5777°N 149.4028°W
Holiday Inn hotel	Tampere, Finland	61.500092°N 23.771460°E
Apple Store	Anchorage 5th Avenue Mall, Anchorage, Alaska, United States	61.216761°N 149.888655°W
Massimo Dutti	Helsinki, Finland	60.169145°N 24.944783°E
Louis Vuitton	Helsinki, Finland	60.167913°N 24.945365°E
Tesco	Lerwick, Mainland, Shetland, Scotland	60.147212°N 1.160873°W
Aldi	Macduff, Scotland	57.66210°N 2.490319°W
Marks & Spencer	Elgin, Scotland	57.648215°N 3.319180°W
Kaufland	Flensburg, Germany	54.7617453°N 9.4314052°E
Toys "R" Us	York, United Kingdom	53.988581°N 1.044923°W

==== Car brands ====
Brand	Place	Latitude/longitude
Toyota retailer	Svalbard Auto AS, Longyearbyen, Svalbard, Norway	78.22°N 15.65°E
Honda retailer	Reidar Svendsen AS, Berlevåg, Norway	70.857196°N 29.096604°E
Mercedes-Benz and Peugeot retailer	Star Autoco, Hammerfest, Norway	70.670005°N 23.689548°E
Citroën retailer	Barents bil AS, Hammerfest, Norway	70.635791°N 23.677346°E
Volkswagen retailer	Hammerfest Auto AS, Hammerfest, Norway	70.635787°N 23.677368°E
Mitsubishi retailer	AS Normaskin Tana, Tana bru, Norway	70.203062°N 28.177010°E
Mazda and Ford retailer	Autosalg AS, Vadsø, Norway	70.081658°N 29.701754°E
Volvo retailer	Harila AS, Vadsø, Norway	70.106652°N 29.3458476°E
Audi retailer	Alta Motor, Alta, Norway	69.9601261°N 23.2287554°E
Nissan retailer	Alta Autosenter AS, Alta, Norway	69.958641°N 23.223113°E
Porsche retailer	Traasdahl AS, Tromsø, Norway	69.699517°N 19.015704°E
Lexus retailer	Lexus Tromsø, Tromsø, Norway	69.696031°N 19.014185°E
BMW retailer	Trondsen Bil AS, Tromsø, Norway	69.694114°N 19.010071°E
Dacia retailer	Trondsen Bil AS, Tromsø, Norway	69.694114°N 19.010071°E
Tesla retailer	Tesla Tromsø, Tromsø, Norway	69.67620°N 18.92262°E
Opel retailer	Biltrend Tromsø, Tromsø, Norway	69.628337°N 18.949932°E

==== Fast food restaurants ====
Brand	Place	Latitude/longitude
Tim Hortons	Pond Inlet, Nunavut, Canada	72.696762°N 77.961962°W
Burger King	Tromsø, Norway	69.671642°N 18.920732°E
McDonald's	Tromsø, Norway	69.6498481°N 18.9558126°E
Carl's Jr.	Talnakh, Russia	69.484164°N 88.398700°E
Cinnabon	Norilsk, Russia	69.358918°N 88.183021°E
KFC	Cambridge Bay, Nunavut, Canada	69.116327°N 105.052977°W
Pizza Hut	Cambridge Bay, Nunavut, Canada	69.116327°N 105.052977°W
Subway	Levi, Finland	67.804775°N 24.804775°E
Starbucks	Bodø, Norway	67.277304°N 14.423807°E
Taco Bell	Tornio, Finland	65.843798°N 24.166019°E
Domino's Pizza	Akureyri, Iceland	65.691547°N 18.107539°W
Wendy's	Fairbanks, Alaska, United States	64.835971°N 147.754830°W
Dairy Queen	Palmer, Alaska, United States	61.599488°N 149.120728°W
Denny's	Anchorage, Alaska, United States	61.209457°N 149.806822°W
Baskin Robbins	Anchorage, Alaska, United States	61.192737°N 149.877587°W

=== Restaurants ===
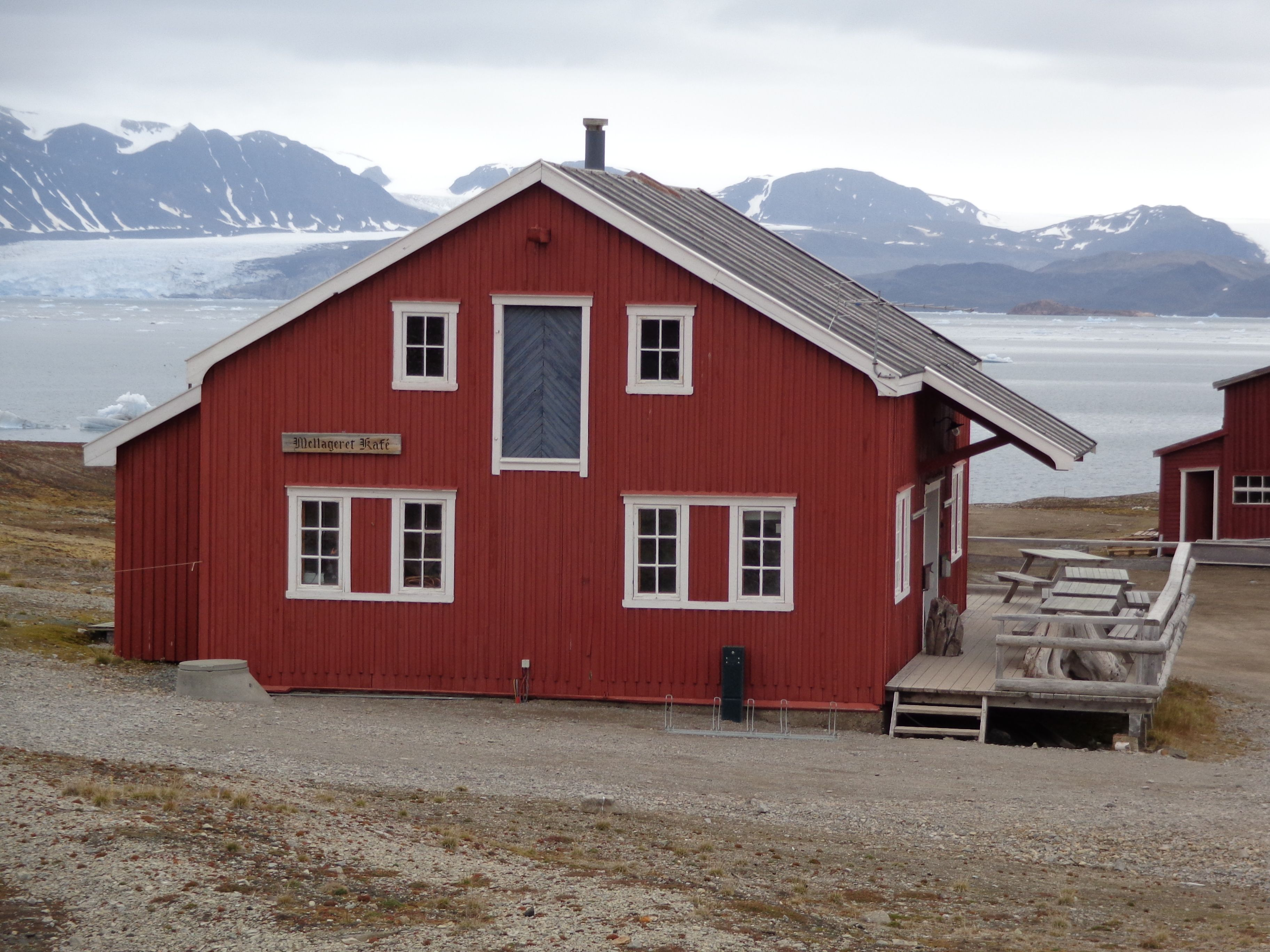
Mellageret Kafe, Ny-Ålesund, Svalbard

Category	Place	Latitude/longitude
Restaurant	Messa, Kings Bay Service, Ny-Ålesund, Svalbard, Norway	78.923769°N 11.905344°E (coordinates of Ny-Ålesund)
Bar	Culture House, Pyramiden, Svalbard, Norway	78.655639°N 16.306972°E
Gourmet restaurant	Huset, Longyearbyen, Svalbard, Norway	78°13′N 15°33′E
Kebab restaurant	Røde Isbjørn, Longyearbyen, Svalbard, Norway	78°13′N 15°33′E
Nightclub	Huset Nattklubb, Longyearbyen, Svalbard, Norway	78°13′N 15°33′E
Café	Café Huskies, Longyearbyen, Svalbard, Norway	78°13′N 15°33′E
Pizzeria	Classic Pizza, Longyearbyen, Svalbard, Norway	78°13′N 15°33′E (coordinates of Longyearbyen)
Russian restaurant	78th Parallel, Barentsburg, Svalbard, Norway	78°04′N 14°13′E (coordinates of Barentsburg)
Internet café	Innaarsuit, Greenland, Denmark	73.12°N 56.00°W (coordinates of Innaarsuit)
Mexican restaurant	Cruz's Mexican Grill, Utqiaġvik, Alaska, United States	71.297929°N 156.773480°W
Chinese restaurant	Sam & Lee's Restaurant, Utqiaġvik, Alaska, United States	71.290820°N 156.788959°W
Ice bar	Artico Ice Bar AS, Honningsvåg, Norway	70.981667°N 25.971888°E
Hospital restaurant	Hammerfest sykehuskantine, Hammerfest, Norway	70.672703°N 23.672394°E
Hot dog stand	Ittoqqortoormiit, Greenland, Denmark	70°29′07″N 21°58′00″W
Indian restaurant	Indigo, Vadsø, Norway	70.073690°N 29.748658°E
Wok restaurant	Shanghai Wok AS, Tromsø, Norway	69.654993°N 18.963268°E
Tea house	Tante Ingers tehus, Tromsø, Norway	69.652998°N 18.962004°E
Falafel buffet	Hildr Gastro Bar, Tromsø, Norway	69.652970°N 18.961961°E
Vegetarian restaurant	Sivertsen Kafé, Tromsø, Norway	69.651779°N 18.954476°E
Irish pub	O'Learys, Tromsø Airport, Norway	69.67945°N 18.90769°E
Truck stop	Coldfoot, Alaska, United States	67°15′N 150°10′W (coordinates of Coldfoot, Alaska)
Michelin starred restaurant	Tapio, Ruka, Finland	66.166427°N 29.138159°E
Ethiopian restaurant	Wedeb's Restaurant, Tromsø, Norway	69.654216°N 18.964155°E

== Factories ==
Category	Place	Latitude/longitude
Sawmill	Logosol, Trollholmen, Nordkapp Municipality, Norway	71.015960°N 25.887109°E
Feed company	Polarfeed AS, Øksfjord, Norway	70.239849°N 22.346790°E
Concrete factory	Jaro AS, Alta, Norway	69.963283°N 23.356076°E
Glass factory	Blåst Glasshytta, Tromsø, Troms, Norway	69.645951°N 18.951922°E
Glazing factory	Nicopan AS, Vangsvik, Norway	69.191576°N 17.768294°E
Producer of beeswax candles	Lødingen Arbeidssenter, Lødingen Municipality, Norway	68.412611°N 15.995524°E
Cement factory	Norcem AS, Kjøpsvik, Norway	68.093120°N 16.369060°E
Ironworks (historical)	Kengis Bruk, Pajala, Sweden	67.191261°N 23.511777°E
Cable factory	Nexans Norway AS, Rognan, Norway	67.091370°N 15.393615°E
Tannery	Kero Försäljning AB, Pajala, Sweden	67.085050°N 23.362657°E
Violin maker	Salten Violinmageres Selskap, Salten, Norway	67°05′N 15°03′E
Fertilizer company	Yara Norge Glomfjord Fabrikker, Glomfjord, Norway	66.816425°N 13.940490°E
Sticker factory	Pelloplast Oy, Pello, Finland	66.792525°N 24.004713°E
Plastic sheet factory	Lapin Muovi Oy, Rovaniemi, Finland	66.515220°N 25.711239°E
Sledge factory	BRP Finland Oy, Rovaniemi, Finland	66.491584°N 25.648752°E
Ceramics factory	Pentik, Posio, Finland	66.113073°N 28.181456°E
Steel producer	Outokumpu Tornio Works, Tornio, Finland	65.844024°N 24.153330°E
Paper mill	Veitsiluoto, Kemi, Finland	65.692419°N 24.618635°E
Cell phone producer	Bittium Oyj, Oulu, Finland	65.058206°N 25.453052°E
Manufacturer of travel trailers	Polar, Dorotea, Sweden	64.258710°N 16.426263°E
Brick factory	Ylivieskan Tiili Oy, Ylivieska, Finland	64.009546°N 24.767748°E
Tractor factory	Valtra Oy Ab, Suolahti, Äänekoski, Finland	62.544736°N 25.904517°E
Tire producer	Nokian Tyres, Nokia, Finland	61.475459°N 23.508788°E
Car factory	Valmet Automotive Oy, Uusikaupunki, Finland	60.810981°N 21.445720°E
Producer of down feather products	Joutsen Finland Oy, Riihimäki, Finland	60.759085°N 24.779927°E
Clock factory	Suunto Oy, Vantaa, Finland	60.271998°N 24.971822°E

=== Food and drinks ===
Category	Place	Latitude/longitude
Brewery	Svalbard Bryggeri, Longyearbyen, Svalbard, Norway	78.22°N 15.65°E (coordinates of Longyearbyen)
Chocolate factory	Kafé Fruene, Longyearbyen, Svalbard, Norway	78.22°N 15.65°E (coordinates of Longyearbyen)
Bottled water factory	Svalbarði, Longyearbyen, Svalbard, Norway	78.22°N 15.65°E (coordinates of Longyearbyen)
Fish factory	Royal Greenland's Fish Factory, Nutaarmiut, Greenland, Denmark	72°42′N 55°25′W
Dairy	TINE, Tana Municipality, Norway	70.201792°N 28.173149°E
Winery	North Cape Wine, Lakselv, Norway	70.048887°N 24.974718°E
Cheese producer	Vildenvang, Nordreisa Municipality, Norway	69.829193°N 21.128502°E
Syrup producer	Reisa AS, Sørkjosen, Norway	69.785627°N 20.948877°E
Distillery	AuroraSpirit AS, Lyngseidet, Norway	69.574269°N 20.219294°E
Producer of cola drinks	Mack Brewery, Balsfjord Municipality, Norway	69.215222°N 19.572691°E
Salt producer	Arctic Salt, Saltstraumen, Bodø, Norway	67.227748°N 14.625070°E
Whiskey distillery	Myken Destilleri, Myken, Helgeland, Norway	66.761467°N 12.481389°E
Coffee roastery	Svalbard Brenneri, Longyearbyen, Svalbard, Norway	78.221475°N 15.642860°E
Gin producer	Sangen Oy, Oulu, Finland	65.057195°N 25.458749°E
Malt whisky destillery	Box Destillery, Bjärtrå, Sweden	63.001520°N 17.798573°E
Sugar refinery	Sucros Oy, Säkylä, Finland	61.076138°N 22.252231°E
Mustard factory	LissEllas senap, Garpenberg, Sweden	60.317118°N 16.194826°E
Sake brewery	Nye Gressholmen Kro, Gressholmen Kro, Oslo, Norway	59.884100°N 10.722241°E

== Farming ==
Category	Place	Latitude/longitude
Greenhouse	Ny-Ålesund, Svalbard, Norway	78°55′30″N 11°55′20″E
Producer of herbs	Polar Gardens, Longyearbyen, Svalbard, Norway	78.22°N 15.65°E
Fish farm	Grieg Seafood Finnmark, Nordkapp Municipality, Norway	70°58′41″N 25°58′30″E
Poultry farm	Lebesby Municipality, Norway	70°56′43″N 27°21′5″E
Beekeeper	Rolvsøy, Måsøy Municipality, Norway	70°56′N 24°2′E
Farm (sheep, poultry, cattle)	Gammelhjem, Sørøya Gjestehus, Sørøya, Norway	70.680986°N 23.002413°E
Dairy farm	Bækkarfjord, Finnmark, Norway	70.616667°N 27.133333°E
Producer of reindeer meat	Finnmark Rein, Tana Municipality, Norway	70.193553°N 28.183741°E
Alpaca farm	Lakselv, Norway	70°03′04″N 24°58′18″E
Riding camp	Saarela gård, Lakselv, Norway	70°03′04″N 24°58′18″E
Potato cultivation area	Finnmark, Norway	70°N 25°E
Cereal cultivation area	Alta Municipality, Norway	69°58′36″N 23°17′45″E
Milking machine	Eiby, Alta Municipality, Norway	69°53′14″N 23°12′23″E
Community-supported farm	Sør-Varanger Municipality, Norway	69°43′43″N 30°02′30″E
Strawberry field	Tromsø Municipality, Norway	69°40′58″N 18°56′34″E
Rose garden	Kvaløya, Tromsø Municipality, Norway	69°37′N 18°33′E
Apple garden	moen, Målselv Municipality, Norway	69°15′N 18°33′E
Fur farm	Kåfjorddal, Norway	69°36′15″N 20°32′05″E
Wild sheep farmer	Brenngam Garden, Brenngammen, Svanvik, Sør-Varanger Municipality, Norway	69°27′10″N 30°3′15″E
Ostrich farm	Murmansk, Russia	68°58′N 33°05′E
Pig farm	Prigorodnyi, Murmansk, Russia	68°58′N 33°05′E
Sea buckthorn plantation	Kittilä, Finland	67°39′25″N 24°50′30″E
Asparagus field	Pello, Finland	66°46′30″N 23°57′55″E
Hop plantation	Ylitornio, Finland	66°19′N 23°40′E
Mustard plantation	Kukkola, Tornio, Finland	65°58′37.304″N 24°4′12.054″E
Plantation of vegetable oil plants	Kukkola, Tornio, Finland	65°58′37.304″N 24°4′12.054″E
Vineyard	Ranua-Northern Lights, Ranua, Finland	65.944606°N 26.465153°E
Barley cultivation area	Area of Oulu, Finland	65°01′N 25°28′E
Wheat cultivation area	Northern Ostrobothnia, Finland	65°N 26°E
Banana plantation	Agricultural University of Iceland, Hveragerði, Iceland	64.560925°N 21.770693°W
Apple, pear cultivation area	near Dawson City,Canada	69°3′52″N 139°4′8″W
Fruit garden (rhubarb, raspberry, blackcurrant, redcurrant, bilberry, plum, cranberry, chokeberry)	near Dawson City, Canada	64°3′52″N 139°4′8″W
Celeriac field	Frosta Municipality, Norway	63°36′14″N 10°46′28″E
Sugar beet plantation	Pedersöre, Finland	63°36′N 22°48′E
Cornfield	Kaikontarha, Vehmersalmi, Kuopio, Finland	62.724596°N 27.826237°E
Flax cultivation area	Hälsingland, Sweden	61°30′43″N 16°30′25″E
Permaculture farm	Ridgedale Permaculture, Västra Ämtervik, Sweden	59.749107°N 13.063431°E
Oyster farm	Kachemak Bay, Alaska, United States	59.606581°N 151.438422°W
Soy plantation	Uppland, Sweden	59°45′N 18°0′E
Chickpea plantation	Northern Alberta, Canada	approximately 58°N
Truffle plantation	Bräntings farmyard, Gotland, Sweden	57.468412°N 18.486745°E
Lavender field	Lavendelbo, Hjallerup, Denmark	57.154161°N 10.204182°E
Apricot plantation	Ural State Agricultural University, Yekaterinburg, Russia	56.843694°N 60.610648°E
Chili farm	Overstekvarn Gotland, Visby, Gotland, Sweden	57.7366168°N 18.4042667°E
Tea plantation	Roskilde, Denmark	55°38′0″N 12°4′0″E
Olive grove	Anglesey, Wales, United Kingdom	53°25′N 04°25′W
Sweet potato cultivation area	northernmost China	53°N 123°E
Grapefruit garden	Chelsea Physic Garden, London, United Kingdom	51.485008°N 0.162425°W
Sorghum cultivation area	northernmost France	51°N 2°E
Cherry, Peach cultivation	North Okanagan, Okanagan valley, British Columbia, Canada	50°17′46″N 119°14′32″W
Rice field	Near highway 11 (Abbotsford), Fraser Valley, Canada	49°1′39″N 122°15′32″W
Lemon garden	North Saanich, Vancouver Island, Canada	48°40′38″N 123°28′8″W
Cotton plantation	Southern Kazakhstan	approximately 43–44°N
Coffee field	Morro Bay, California, United States	35°22′N 120°51′W
Sugarcane field	Rapides Parish, Louisiana, United States	31°20′N 92°54′W
Cassava growing area	Southern China	approximately 25°N
Cocoa plantation	Northern Cibao Valley, Dominican Republic	19.6269°N 70.2774°W
Commercial mango growing area	area around Valencia, Valencian Community, Spain	north of 39°N

== Gardens, zoos and aquaria ==
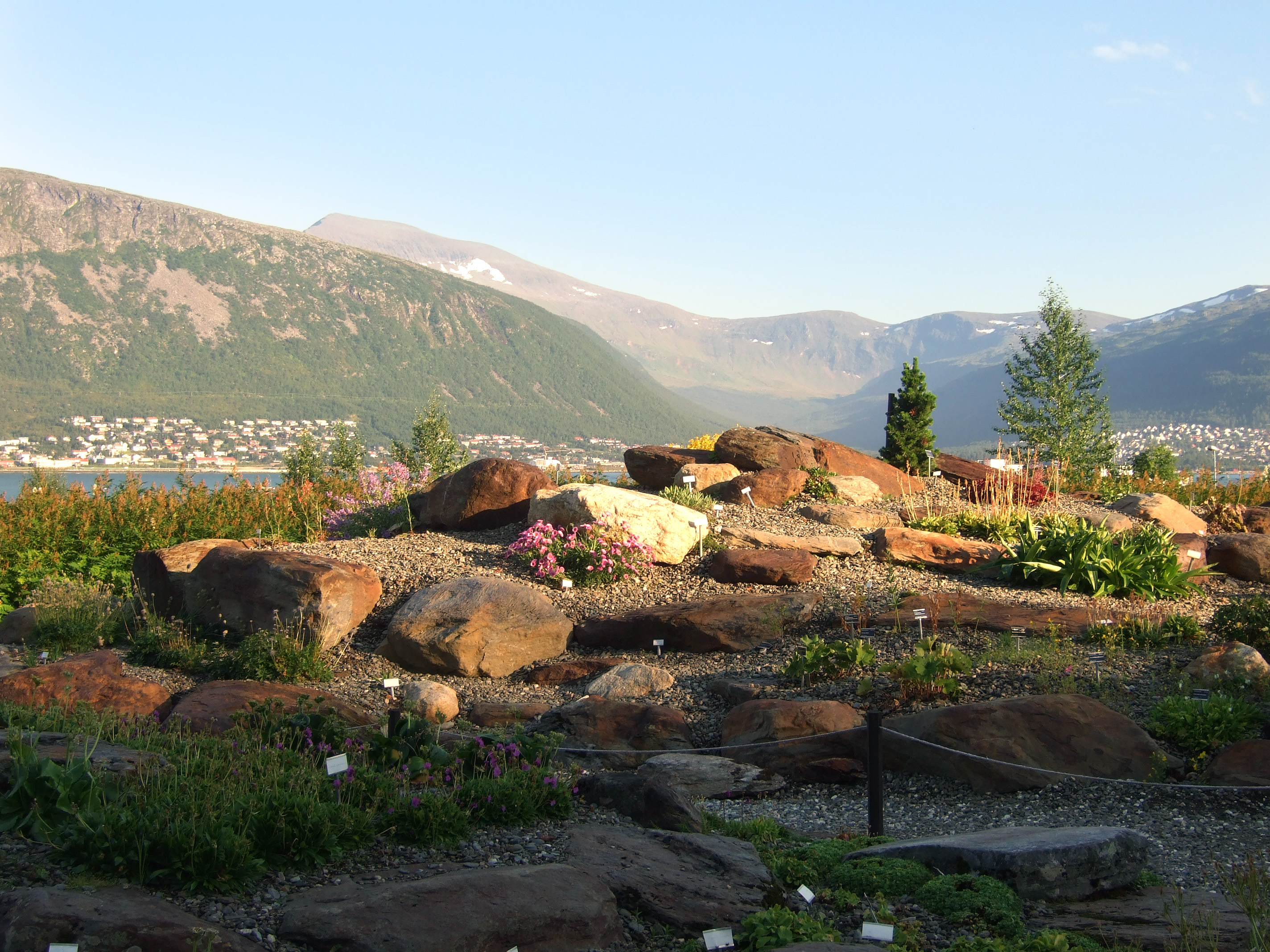
Botanical garden, Tromsø, Norway

Category	Place	Latitude/longitude
Greenhouse	Ny-Ålesund, Svalbard, Norway	78°55′30″N 11°55′20″E
Green wall	shopping centre Amfi Veita, Tromsø, Troms, Norway	69.651948°N 18.958050°E
Aquarium	Polaria, Tromsø, Troms, Norway	69.643695°N 18.949787°E
Botanical garden	Tromsø Botaniske Hage, Tromsø, Troms, Norway	69°40′N 18°56′E
Zoo	Bardu Municipality, Troms, Norway	69°40′N 18°56′E
Wildlife park	Polar Park, Bardu Municipality, Norway	68.691272°N 18.110072°E
Allotment garden	Rovaniemi, Finland	66.475146°N 25.694047°E
Renaissance garden	Lurøygården, Lurøy Municipality, Norway	66°25′55″N 12°51′18″E
Arboretum	Arboretum Norr, Umeå, Sweden	63.840077°N 20.115958°E
Plant nursery for fruit trees	Plant nursery of Blomqvist, Pedersöre, Finland	63.675475°N 22.897542°E
Botanical butterfly garden	Perhos-Botania, Joensuu, Finland	62.602495°N 29.723827°E
Fruit research institute	Leikanger, Sogndal Municipality, Norway	61°13′51″N 06°47′23″E
Japanese garden	Helsinki, Finland	60°11′56″N 25°03′20″E
Tropical island	Flor & Fjære, Stavanger, Norway	58.972678°N 5.730347°E
Dolphinarium	Kolmården Wildlife Park, Norrköping, Sweden	58.662210°N 16.459175°E (coordinates of Kolmården Wildlife Park)
Islamic garden	Aga Khan Garden, University of Alberta, Edmonton, Alberta, Canada	53.407742°N 113.759556°W

== International organizations ==
Organization	Place	Latitude/longitude
Rotary Club	Longyearbyen, Svalbard, Norway	78.22°N 15.65°E
Lions Club	Utqiaġvik, Alaska, United States	71.299004°N 156.758916°W
Red Cross office	Mehamn, Norway	71°02′08″N 27°50′57″W
4-H	Nordkapp Municipality, Norway	70°58′41″N 25°58′29″W
Ten Sing group	Alta Municipality, Norway	69.966207°N 23.272133°E
Youth With A Mission center	YWAM Borgen, Oteren, Norway	69.267214°N 19.946878°E
SOS Children's Village	Murmansk, Russia	68°58′N 33°05′E
Jamboree	Bodø Municipality, Norway	67°16′48″N 14°24′0″E
Girl Guides of Canada District	Inuvik, Northwest Territories, Canada	68°21′39"N 133°43′47"W
Girl Scout Council	Fairbanks, Alaska, United States	64.849441°N 147.699847°W
Alcoholics Anonymous	Fairbanks, Alaska, United States	64.843107°N 147.716393°W
Greenpeace office	Helsinki, Finland	60.0947°N 24.5630°E

== Buildings and landmarks ==
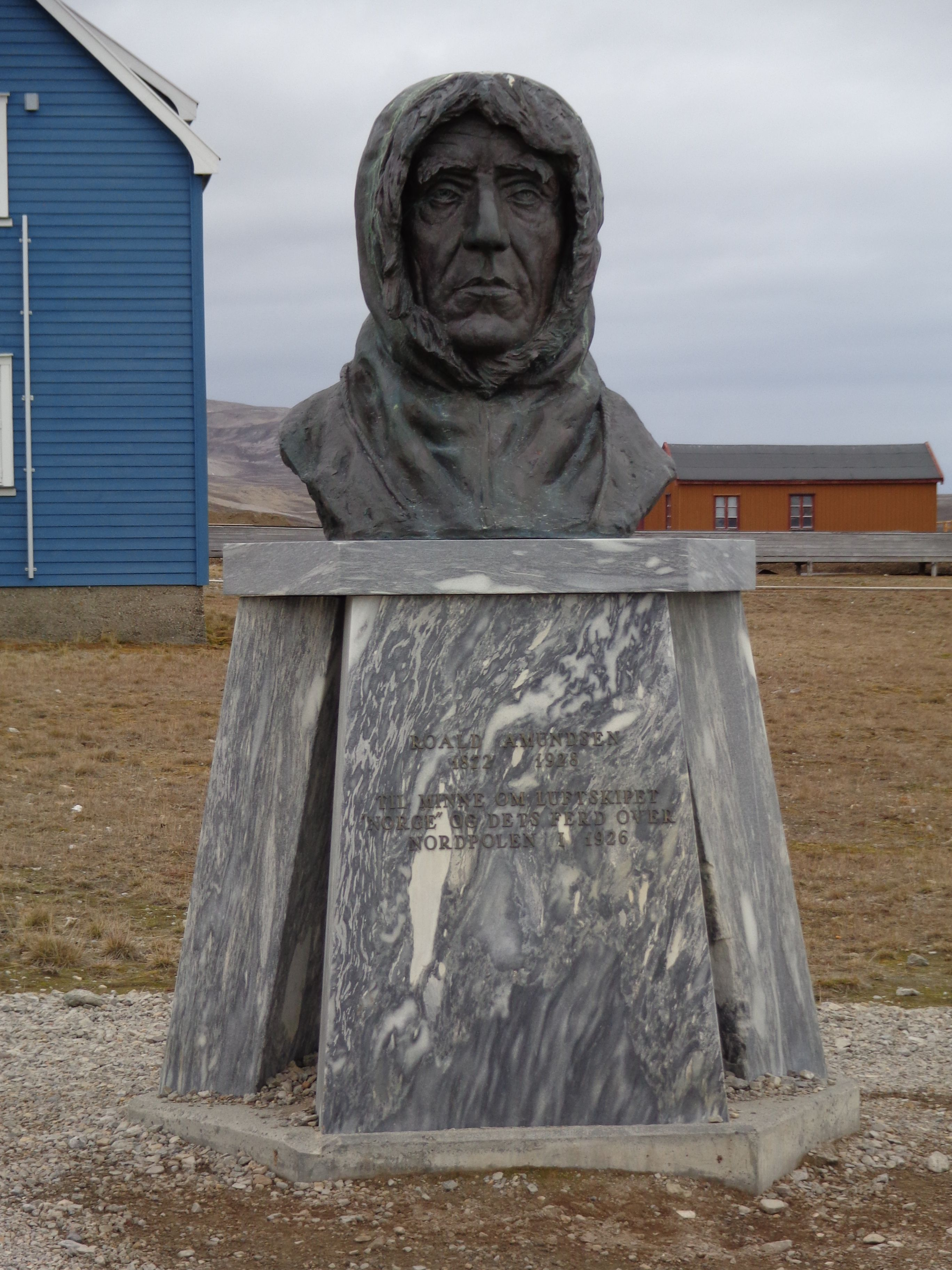
Roald Amundsen monument, Ny-Ålesund, Svalbard, Norway

Type of Building	Place	Latitude/longitude
Statue	statue of St. Nicholas, Nagurskoye, Alexandra Land, Franz Josef Land, Arkhangelsk Oblast, Russia	80°48′N 47°36′E
Bust	bust of Roald Amundsen, Ny-Ålesund, Svalbard, Norway	78°55′N 11°56′E
Timber building	geological research station, Ny-Ålesund, Svalbard, Norway	78°55′N 11°56′E (coordinates of Ny-Ålesund)
Lighthouse	Isfjord Lighthouse, Svalbard, Norway	78.063°N 13.607°E
Totem pole	Utqiaġvik, Alaska, United States	71°17′N 156°47′W (coordinates of Utqiaġvik, Alaska)
Mainland lighthouse	Slettnes Lighthouse, Gamvik Municipality, Norway	71.089379°N 28.218609°E
Passive house	Sjunde huset, Kiruna, Sweden	67°51′N 20°13′E
Mansion	Kengis bruksherrgård, Pajala, Sweden	67.191273°N 23.511745°E
Earthship	Skattungbyn, Orsa Municipality, Sweden	61°12′N 14°52′E
Skyscraper	Lakhta Center, St. Petersburg, Russia (at least 150 m) Atlas, Helsinki, Finland (at least 100 m)	59.987139°N 30.177028°E 60.207046°N 25.147808°E
Medieval monument of Islamic architecture	Bolgar Complex, Bolgar, Russia	54°58′44″N 49°03′23″E

== Other ==
Category	Place	Latitude/longitude
Webcam	North Pole Environmental Observatory, drifting on the Arctic Ocean's pack ice	84.1°N 2°E (August, position varies)
Discovered dinosaur fossil	Hadrasaurid fossil, Axel Heiberg Island, Nunavut, Canada	79°26′N 90°46′E
Sauna	Radisson Blu Polar Hotel, Longyearbyen, Svalbard, Norway	78.221058°N 15.646921°E
Wine cellar	Radisson Blu Polar Hotel, Longyearbyen, Svalbard, Norway	78.221058°N 15.646921°E
Alternative newspaper	Icepeople, Longyearbyen, Svalbard, Norway	78.22°N 15.65°E
Bank robbery	Sparebank 1 Nord-Norge, Longyearbyen, Svalbard, Norway	78.22°N 15.65°E
Food festival	SmakSvalbard, Longyearbyen, Svalbard, Norway	78.22°N 15.65°E
Former cemetery	Longyearbyen, Svalbard, Norway	78.22°N 15.65°E
Mine	Gruve 7, Longyearbyen, Svalbard, Norway	78.22°N 15.65°E
Newspaper	Svalbardposten, Longyearbyen, Svalbard, Norway	78.22°N 15.65°E
Radio station	Svalbard Radio, Longyearbyen, Svalbard, Norway	78.22°N 15.65°E
Secular coming-of-age ceremony	Longyearbyen, Svalbard, Norway	78.22°N 15.65°E
Sundial	Longyearbyen, Svalbard, Norway	78.22°N 15.65°E
Pride parade	Longyearbyen Pride, Longyearbyen, Svalbard, Norway	78.22°N 15.65°E (coordinates of Longyearbyen)
Diplomatic mission	Swiss Consulate in Longyearbyen on Svalbard, Norway	78°13′02″N 015°37′58″E
Cemetery	Siorapaluk, Greenland, Denmark	77°47′00″N 70°38′00″W
U.S. military base	Pituffik Space Base, North Star Bay, Greenland	76.533021°N 68.706362°W
UNESCO world heritage site (natural)	Natural System of Wrangel Island Reserve, Chukotka, Russia	71.14°N 179.25°W
Fishing village	Skarsvåg, Norway	71°06′47″N 25°49′37″W
Telephone booth	Honningsvåg, Norway	70°59′N 25°59′E
Orphanage	Uummannaq Children's Home, Uummannaq, Greenland, Denmark	70°40′29″N 52°07′35″W
UNESCO world heritage site (cultural)	Struve Geodetic Arc, Hammerfest Municipality, Norway	70°40′N 23°39′E
Refugee shelter	Hammerfest, Norway	70°39′N 23°41′E (coordinates of Hammerfest)
Fish festival	Sørvær, Hasvik Municipality, Norway	70°37′49″N 21°59′04″E
Bird festival	Gullfest, Varanger Peninsula, Norway	70°29′01″N 29°32′26″E
Prison	Vadsø prison, Norway	70.077469°N 29.769419°E
Recording studio	Vadsø, Norway	70°04′24″N 29°44′59″E
Military garrison	Porsanger Municipality, Norway	70°03′08″N 24°57′21″E
Former prison	Gorlag Penal Center (closed 1954), Norilsk, Krasnoyarsk Krai, Russia	69.978058°N 88.646921°E
Television station and studio	NRK Tromsø, Tromsø, Norway	69.637140°N 18.916088°E
Google Earth 3D imagery	Kvaløysetta, South Kvaløya, Tromsø Municipality, Norway	69°43′10″N 18°57′23″E
Cat show	Ishavskatten, Tromsø, Norway	69°40′N 18°56′E
Packaging center	Tromspotet AS, Silsand, Norway	69.241408°N 17.952723°E
Crematory	Kiruna, Sweden	67.851193°N 20.244156°E
Church bell	Bodø Cathedral, Bodø, Norway	67.2824°N 14.3821°E
Daily newspaper	Lapin Kansa, Rovaniemi, Finland	66.496122°N 25.715692°E
Dinosaur exhibition	University of Alaska Museum, Fairbanks, Alaska, United States	64.858516°N 147.842306°W
Unesco Geopark	Rokua, Vaala, Finland	64.566280°N 26.499754°E
Skyspace	Ytterjärna Hotel, Järna, Sweden	59.067743°N 17.615365°E
NOAA Weather Radio Station	KZZ53, Utqiagvik, North Slope Borough, Alaska, United States	71.288193°N 156.762407°W

== See also ==
- List of southernmost items
- Extreme points of Earth
- Extreme points of the Arctic

== Notes ==
1. That is, recreational beach with an extensive stretch of fine sand of gradual slope, where beach swimming, sunbathing, and surfing are regularly practiced. The remote Norwegian resort town of Grense Jakobselv, on the Barents Sea at the Norwegian-Russian border 69°46′30″N 30°49′52″E, also has an extensive sand beach of gradual slope (the Lungomare), but the air and water are cold even in summer, and traditional southern-beach activities are much less common.
