= Kaffeklubben Sø =

Lake in Peary Land, Greenland

Coordinates: 83°35′N 32°35′W

Kaffeklubben Sø is a lake on the northern coast of Peary Land, Greenland, described as the world's northernmost lake. It was formed about 3,500 years ago when glacial retreat allowed rain to collect as a lake.

The lake has an area of 48 ha (120 acres) and a maximum depth of 14.5 m (48 ft).
