= Svalbard Act =

1925 law of Norway

The Svalbard Act of 17 July 1925 no. 11, normally referred to as the Svalbard Act (Norwegian: lov om Svalbard or colloquially Svalbardloven), is a law of Norway which governs the major aspects of the Svalbard archipelago. The law was passed by the Parliament of Norway on 17 July 1925, establishes Norwegian sovereignty of the island, and states that Norwegian criminal law, civil law and procedure law are enforced on the island. Otherwise, other provisions and laws only apply when specified. The act further established the policy for administration, including creating the Governor of Svalbard, and since 2002, Longyearbyen Community Council. The act also establishes rules for real estate and environmental protection.

The act was passed as a response to the Spitsbergen Treaty of 9 February 1920, which established Norwegian sovereignty of Svalbard, but limited the archipelago to a free economic zone and demilitarized zone. The act established the basis for an orderly civil society on the islands, which had until that point been prone to lawlessness among miners, fishermen and hunters.

The law has been amended several times, and consists of 6 chapters and 46 paragraphs. Chapter One (§§1–4) covers the relationship between Norway and Svalbard; Chapter Two (§§5–13) pertains to governance and courts; Chapter Three (§§14–21) concerns family law; Chapter Four (§§22–28) governs property law; Chapter Five (§§29–44) establishes the Longyearbyen Community Council, and Chapter Six (§§45–46) consists of miscellaneous provisions. From 1 July 2002, the Svalbard Environmental Act of 15 June 2001 nr. 79 supplements the Svalbard Act, regulating all environmental aspects of the archipelago.
