= Longyearbyen Community Council =

Local government for Longyearbyen, Svalbard, Norway

Type
- Type: Municipal council

Leadership
- Mayor: Leif Terje Aunevik, Liberal Party since 2023

Structure
- Seats: 15 councillors
- Political groups: Liberal Party (7) Labour Party (3) Socialist Left Party (3) Conservative Party (2)
- Length of term: 4 years

Elections
- Last election: 9 October 2023

Meeting place
- Næringsbygget, Longyearbyen 9170, Svalbard

Website
- www.lokalstyre.no

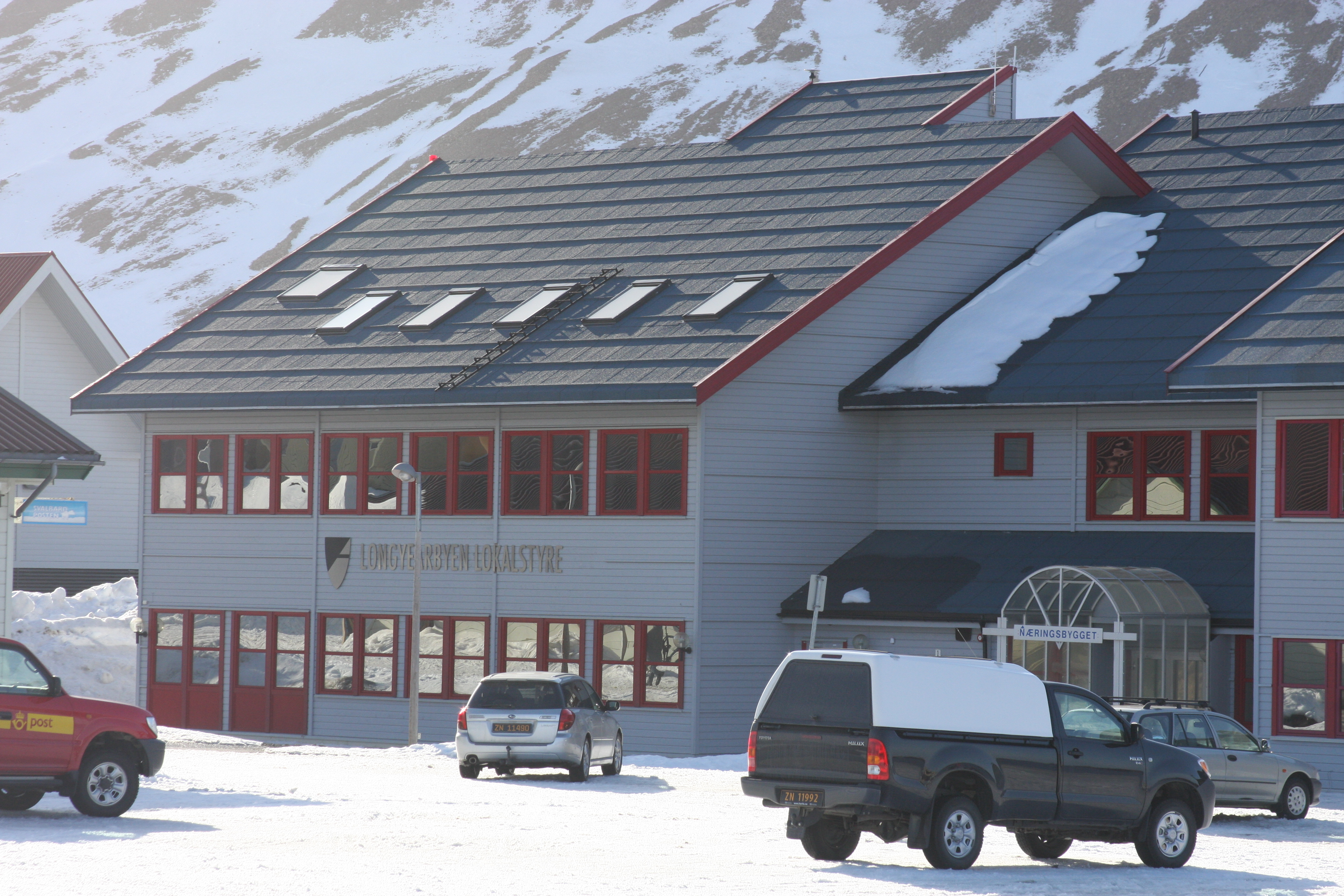
The town hall in 2011

Longyearbyen Community Council (Norwegian: Longyearbyen lokalstyre) is the local government for Longyearbyen in Svalbard, Norway. It has many of the same responsibilities of a municipality. It is organized with a 15-member council which since 2011 has been led by Mayor Christin Kristoffersen of the Labour Party. The council's main responsibilities are infrastructure and utilities, including power, land-use and community planning, education from kindergarten to upper secondary level and child welfare. It operates three kindergartens in addition to the 13-grade Longyearbyen School.

== Background ==
The Svalbard Council was established on 1 November 1971. It consisted of 17 non-partisan members which were elected or appointed in three different groups—Store Norske Spitsbergen Kulkompani (SNSK) employees, government employees and others, although the ratio changed several times. Svalbard Samfunnsdrift (SSD), a limited company which was responsible for public infrastructure and services, was established by SNSK on 1 January 1989. Responsibilities included healthcare, the fire department, the kindergarten, roads, garbage disposal, power production, the water and sewer system, the cinema, cultural activities and the library. Ownership was taken over by the Ministry of Trade and Industry on 1 January 1993. During the 1990s, the authorities started a process to "normalize" Longyearbyen by abolishing the company town scheme and introducing a full range of services, a varied economy and local democracy. The Svalbard Council changed its regulations from 1993 and allowed parties to run for election. Longyearbyen Community Council was established in 2002, replacing the Svalbard Council and assimilating SSD.

== Structure ==
The Community Council is the highest authority of local government in Longyearbyen, and deals with more general issues and policy. The Council elects a mayor and deputy mayor. More individual matters are delegated to committees.

By 2011, there were two permanent committees: the administrative committee, and the environment and business committee, both with 5 members. As of 2023, the following committees exist;

- Administrative Committee (5 members): considers budget proposals and financial matters. It also takes usually council-wide decisions when there is no time to convene the full council;
- Technical, environmental and industrial committee (7 members): considers matters concerning electricity and heating, fire and rescue, technical services, planning and property management. It is also responsible for cooperating with central government strategies, the airport and the UN sustainable development goals;
- Local community, youth and culture committee (7 members): considers matters concerning schooling and education, sports, culture, children and young people. It also is in charge of community grants and working with cultural institutions like museums;
- Multi-party committee (administrative committee + 2 representatives from employees of the Council): considers employer/employee matters within the council;
- Election committee (3 members): submits recommendations to the Council on relevant candidates for board positions.

== Leadership ==
=== Mayor ===
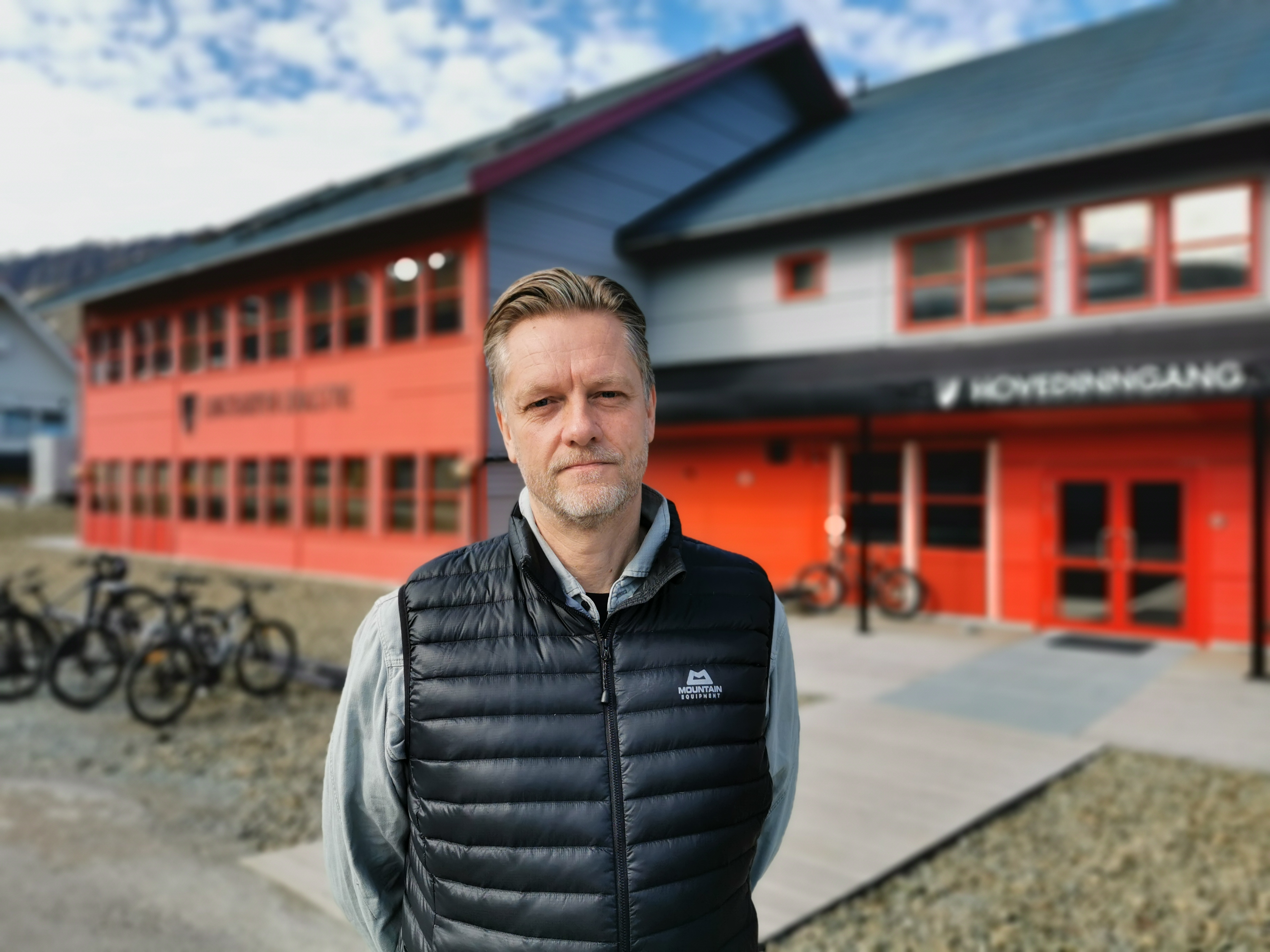
Leif Terje Aunevik, incumbent Mayor of Longyearbyen

The mayors, who have acted as leaders of the council, are listed below.

| Name | Party | Term start | Term end |
|---|---|---|---|
| Sigmund Spjelkavik | Cross-party joint list | Jan 2002 | 2003 |
| Bjørn Fjukstad | Labour | Nov 2003 | 2006 |
| Kjell Mork | Labour | Oct 2006 | 2011 |
| Christin Kristoffersen | Labour | Oct 2011 | 2015 |
| Arild Olsen | Labour | Oct 2015 | 2023 |
| Terje Aunevik | Liberal | 2023 | Incumbent |

== Elections ==
Elections are typically held in early October, some weeks after Norwegian local elections.

Until 2022, foreign nationals residing in Svalbard for three years could vote and stand in local elections.

=== 2023 election ===
The election in 2023 was held on 9 October. It was won by the Liberal Party, who received 49.5% of the votes in the preliminary count on election night. The election was marred by the disenfranchisement of almost all residents without Norwegian citizenship, estimated to affect one-third of the town's population.

The final results were as follows:

| Party | Votes | % | Seats | +/– |
|---|---|---|---|---|
| Liberal | 370 | 53.24 | 7 | +3 |
| Labour | 147 | 21.15 | 3 | –2 |
| Socialist Left | 122 | 17.55 | 3 | +3 |
| Conservative | 56 | 8.06 | 2 | –1 |
| Total | 695 | 100.00 | 15 | – |
| Valid votes | 695 | 92.79 | | |
| Invalid/blank votes | 54 | 7.21 | | |
| Total votes | 749 | 100.00 | | |
| Registered voters/turnout | 1,420 | 56.90 | | |
Source: Official results, Spitsbergen

Following the election, the Liberal and Conservative Parties agreed to work together, with Terje Aunevik from the Liberals as mayor and Celine Anderssen from the Conservatives as deputy mayor.

=== 2019 election ===
The election in 2019 was held over 6–7 October. The Labour Party won the most seats, and the mayor Arild Olsen continued in post.

The final results were as follows:

| Party | Votes | % | Seats | +/– |
|---|---|---|---|---|
| Labour | 350 | 31.36 | 5 | 0 |
| Liberal | 345 | 30.91 | 4 | +1 |
| Conservative | 190 | 17.03 | 3 | –2 |
| Progress | 130 | 11.65 | 2 | +2 |
| Green | 101 | 9.05 | 1 | –1 |
| Total | 1,116 | 100.00 | 15 | – |
| Valid votes | 1,116 | 98.59 | | |
| Invalid/blank votes | 16 | 1.41 | | |
| Total votes | 1,132 | 100.00 | | |
| Registered voters/turnout | 1,827 | 61.96 | | |
Source: Official results

Following the election, Labour, the Conservatives and the Progress Party came to an agreement to govern together, with Labour's Arild Olsen continuing as mayor, and Kjetil Figenschou becoming the deputy mayor.

=== 2015 election ===
The election in 2015 was held over 4–5 October. Preliminary results suggested that the Labour Party and Conservative Party were both tied at 5 seats, followed by the Liberal Party with 3 and Greens with 2.

A few days before the election, an opinion poll among 112 voters, published by Svalbardposten and conducted by Norfakta, suggested that Labour would win the election with 57% of the vote, with the Conservatives at 21%, Greens at 13% and Liberals at 10%. This was an increase in Labour's lead from a poll in 2014.

The final seat results were as follows:

| Party | Seats | +/– |
|---|---|---|
| Labour | 5 | –2 |
| Conservative | 5 | +2 |
| Liberal | 3 | +3 |
| Green | 2 | +2 |
| Cross-party joint list | 0 | –3 |
| Consequence List | 0 | –2 |
| Total | 15 | – |
Source: Annual Report

Despite the Conservatives and Liberals having a majority, attempted negotiations failed and an agreement was forged between Labour and the Liberals, with Arild Olsen becoming the mayor and Eirik Berger from the Liberals becoming deputy mayor.

=== 2011 election ===
The election in 2011 was held over 10–11 October. It was won by the Labour Party, with 7 seats, The election was part of a pilot scheme which reduced the voting age to 16: there were 21 eligible voters aged 16–17.

The Consequence List gained seats for the first time, which promised to abolish the council.

The final results were as follows:

| Party | Votes | % | Seats | +/– |
|---|---|---|---|---|
| Labour | 392 | 43.56 | 7 | 0 |
| Cross-party joint list | 195 | 21.67 | 3 | –1 |
| Conservative | 160 | 17.78 | 3 | 0 |
| Consequence List | 134 | 14.89 | 2 | +2 |
| Progress | 19 | 2.11 | 0 | 0 |
| Total | 900 | 100.00 | 15 | – |
| Valid votes | 900 | 99.23 | | |
| Invalid/blank votes | 7 | 0.77 | | |
| Total votes | 907 | 100.00 | | |
| Registered voters/turnout | 1,592 | 56.97 | | |
Source: Poll of polls

Following the election, Labour's Christin Kristoffersen became the mayor, and the Conservative's Geir Hekne became the deputy.

=== 2007 election ===
The election in 2007 saw victory for the Labour Party, which won 45.5% of the vote.

The final results were as follows: (Note: Voters were able to vote for 15 candidates, so an estimate of party list votes have been calculated by dividing the total votes by 15.)

| Party | Votes | % | Seats | +/– |
|---|---|---|---|---|
| Labour | 279 | 44.36 | 7 | +1 |
| Cross-party joint list | 169 | 26.87 | 4 | –1 |
| Conservative | 112 | 17.81 | 3 | +1 |
| Svalbard List | 42 | 6.68 | 1 | +1 |
| Progress | 27 | 4.29 | 0 | –2 |
| Total | 629 | 100.00 | 15 | – |
| Valid votes | 629 | 98.74 | | |
| Invalid/blank votes | 8 | 1.26 | | |
| Total votes | 637 | 100.00 | | |
| Registered voters/turnout | 1,563 | 40.27 | | |
Source: Official results, Svalbardposten

Following the election, the Council re-elected Labour's Kjell Mork as the mayor.

=== 2003 election ===
The election in 2003 was won by the Labour party, who won 6 of the 15 available seats.

The final seat results were as follows:

| Party | Votes | % | Seats | +/– |
|---|---|---|---|---|
| Labour | 236 | 44.61 | 6 | 0 |
| Cross-party joint list | 164 | 31.00 | 5 | –3 |
| Progress | 65 | 12.29 | 2 | +2 |
| Conservative | 64 | 12.10 | 2 | +1 |
| Total | 529 | 100.00 | 15 | – |
| Valid votes | 529 | 96.71 | | |
| Invalid/blank votes | 18 | 3.29 | | |
| Total votes | 547 | 100.00 | | |
| Registered voters/turnout | 1,334 | 41.00 | | |
Source: Svalbardposten

The turnout saw a substantial drop in support for the fellesliste, with gains made by the Conservative & Progress parties. They had claimed to be alternatives to the establishment, and had been critical of the board's progress.The media also noted that turnout had dropped sharply.

Following the election, the Council elected Labour's Bjørn Fjukstad as mayor. He was supported by the Conservative & Progress parties, alongside Labour.

=== 2001 election ===
The first election to the community council was held over 18–19 November 2001. 4 lists were approved to run by the electoral board. The fellesliste won a small majority of the seats, winning one less than it had on the previous Svalbard Council.

The results were as follows:

| Party | Votes | % | Seats |
|---|---|---|---|
| Cross-party joint list | 298 | 47.83 | 8 |
| Labour | 236 | 37.88 | 6 |
| Conservative | 63 | 10.11 | 1 |
| Christian Democratic | 26 | 4.17 | 0 |
| Total | 623 | 100.00 | 15 |
| Valid votes | 623 | 99.36 | |
| Invalid/blank votes | 4 | 0.64 | |
| Total votes | 627 | 100.00 | |
| Registered voters/turnout | 1,217 | 51.52 | |
Source: Svalbardposten

The council came into force in January 2002, when Sigmund Spjelkavik was elected.
