= Telephone numbers in Svalbard =

- A map of Svalbard within Norway and Europe. Svalbard Norway (except Svalbard) Europe (except Norway)
- Country: Svalbard
- Continent: Europe
- Regulator: Norwegian Communications Authority
- Membership: E.164, Norwegian numbering plan
- Numbering plan type: Closed
- NSN length: 8
- Format: 79 xx xx xx
- Numbering plan: https://nkom.no
- Country code: +47
- International access: 00
- Long-distance: none

Telephone numbers in Svalbard follow the closed national numbering plan of Norway, telephone numbers are regulated and assigned to operators by the Norwegian Communications Authority

Country Code: +47 79 (partial)
International Call Prefix: 00
Trunk Prefix: none

== Background ==
Svalbard is a part of the Kingdom of Norway and is located in the Arctic Ocean. Because it follows the Norwegian system, telephone numbers in Svalbard use Norway's country code rather than an independent code block.

The domestic allocation format is:

+47 79 XX XX XX

Historically, the first two digits of a telephone number in Norway indicated its geographic region, with the 79 prefix assigned specifically to Svalbard. In January 2020, Nkom removed the geographic bindings on numbers, allowing existing number blocks to be assigned to virtual networks and Voice over IP.

== Mobile and emergency services ==
Mobile phone connections deployed on Svalbard do not use the geographic 79 area prefix. Instead, mobile subscriptions uses Norway's standardized national mobile numbering blocks, which begin with the digits 4 or 9 (e.g., +47 4X XX XX XX).

Emergency telephone codes on the archipelago are identical to the shortcodes used across mainland Norway:

- 110: Fire Brigade (Brannvesen)
- 112: Police (Politi)
- 113: Ambulance (Ambulanse)

== Number range allocations ==
Nkom allocates fixed and virtual number blocks within the 79 00 00 00 to 79 99 99 99 range directly to authorized telecom providers.

Number range		Usage
from	to	Usage
79 00 00 00	79 00 49 99	Svalbard, TDC AS
79 00 50 00	79 00 59 99	Svalbard, Telipol AS
79 00 60 00	79 00 99 99	Svalbard, reserve
79 01 00 00	79 02 99 99	Svalbard, Telenor Telecom Solutions AS
79 03 00 00	79 99 99 99	Svalbard, reserve
