= Longyearbyen School =

- Longyearbyen skole
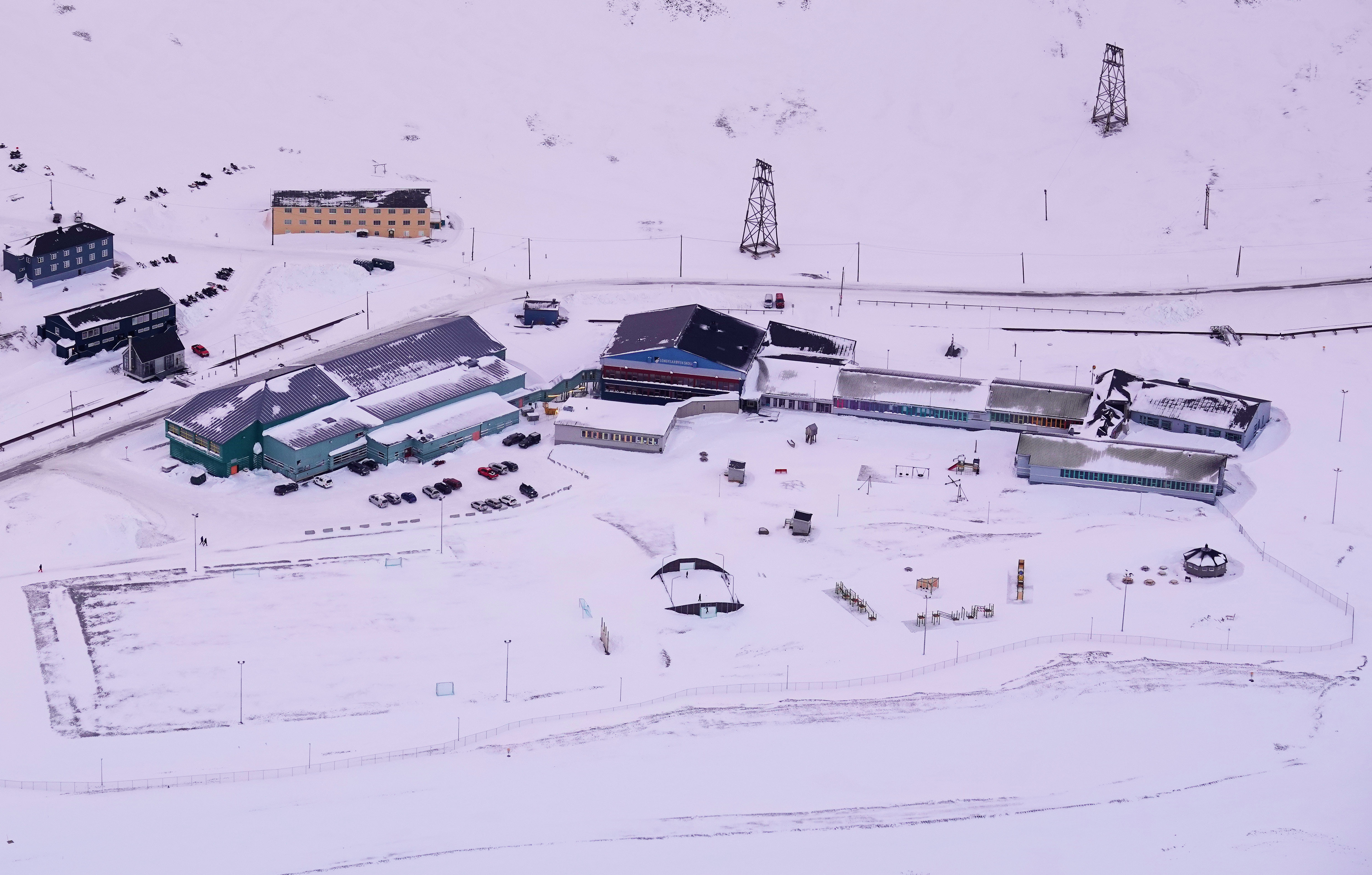

Location
- Longyearbyen; Norway
- Coordinates: 78.2099248°N 15.6125085°E

Information
- Type: K-12 school
- Grades: K-12
- Website: lybskole.no

Longyearbyen School (Norwegian: Longyearbyen skole) is a combined primary and secondary school located in and serving Longyearbyen, the world's northernmost settlement with a population greater than 1,000, in Svalbard, Norway. The school has about 270 pupils and 45 teachers. It is the northernmost school in the world.

== History ==
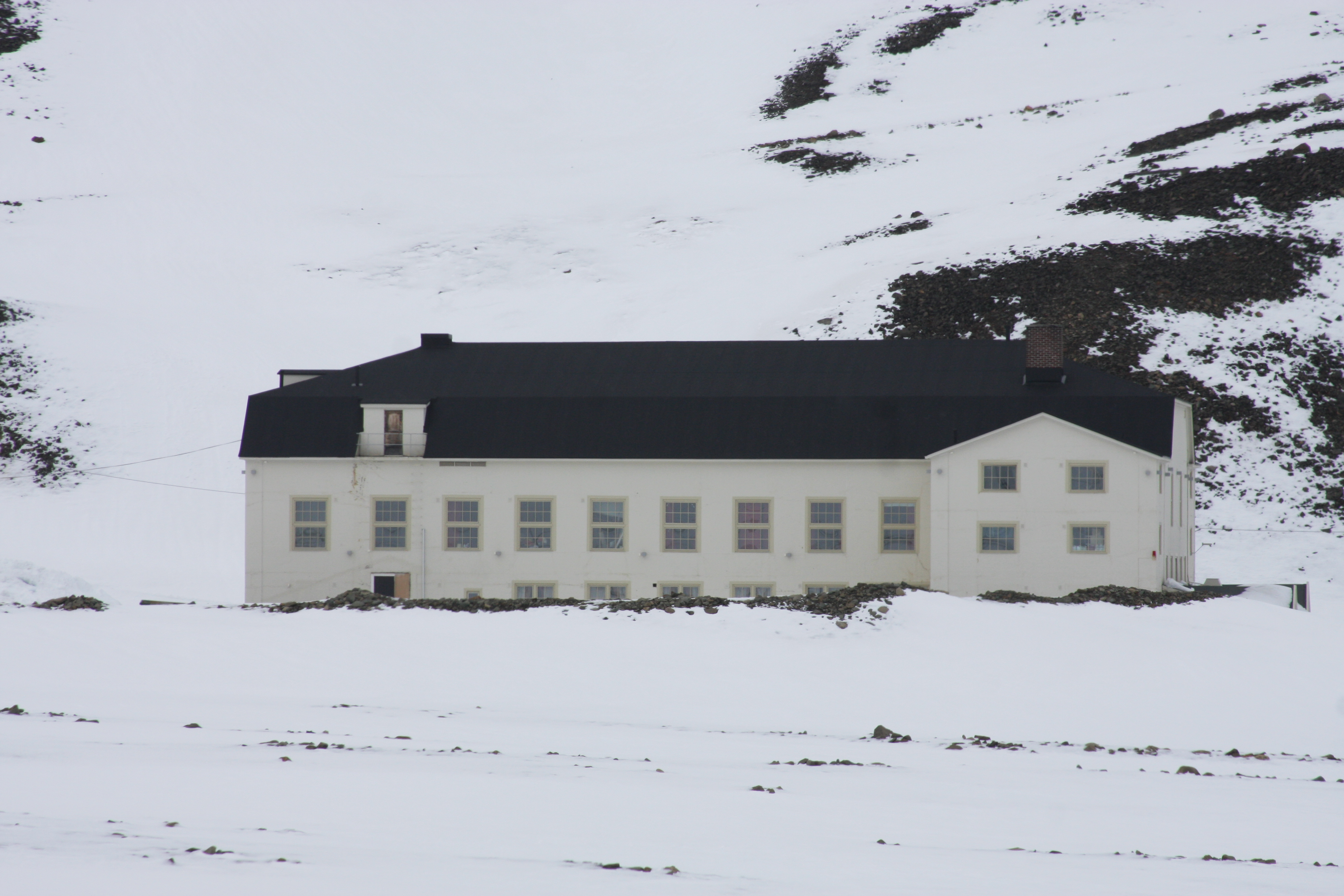
The school was located at Huset from 1951 to 1971.

The school in Longyearbyen was established in 1920 as a cooperation between the Church of Norway and the mining company, Store Norske Spitsbergen Kulkompani (SNSK). The first teacher was vicar Carter Desbarats, who taught in a 4-by-3-meter (13.1 by 9.8 ft) barracks near the church. Originally there were eight pupils, but by 1926 it had grown to sixteen. In 1935 pastor Just Kruse was assigned as principal and teacher of the school. He remained in this role until the evacuation in 1941. A separate school building was taken into use in 1938, but it was destroyed in the bombing of Longyearbyen in 1943. When the school resumed operations in 1946, it initially used a two-room house at Haugen. With the 1951 opening of Huset, a community center, the school was relocated to the second story there.

From 1954, the school was reorganized. It had two classes, the vicar was no longer responsible for teaching, and operations were taken over by SNSK, who received a 25,000 Norwegian krone per year subsidy from the government. From 1957, a principal was hired and the school split into three classes. In 1964, a private middle school was established. From 1971, a new school building was taken into use, in time for the introduction of mandatory nine-year education. The new facilities included a gym and a 12.5-meter (41 ft) swimming pool. From 1972, teachers were no longer permanently employed, but instead given three-year fixed terms.

Ownership and funding of the school was taken over by the Ministry of Education and Research from 1 August 1976. From 1978, upper secondary education was introduced, for which a 148-square-meter (1,590 sq ft) extension was built. A further 440 square meters (4,700 sq ft) was added in 1984. In 1995, an additional 750 square meters (8,100 sq ft) was added and the following year, Svalbardhallen, a multi-purpose indoor sports complex, was opened. The same year, the school received an Internet connection. Regular school for six-year-olds started in 1997. In 1999, the school took over the community's music school. A new middle school building was taken into use in 2005, followed by another section for younger students the following year. From 1 January 2007, ownership was taken over by Longyearbyen Community Council.

== Demographics ==
The student body is highly transient, as working adults in Svalbard usually have two to three year contracts and leave after they finish these contracts. Due to the low population, the school emphasizes friendship and dealing with conflicts properly. In 2007 there were 230 pupils; they consisted of mainly Norwegians, but also pupils from 12 other countries, including around 10 Thai students. Generally, none of the students are born in Svalbard. When children reach the age of 16 or 17, most families move to mainland Norway for improved school access.

== Curriculum ==
The curriculum is largely the same as that of mainland Norway. In 2007 students 16 and older took courses on survival in the wilderness.

== See also ==
- List of northernmost items
