= Christin Kristoffersen =

Norwegian politician

Christin Kristoffersen (born 28 August 1973) is a Norwegian politician for the Labour Party. She was the mayor of Longyearbyen from 2011 to 2015.

Kristoffersen moved to Longyearbyen from Tromsø in January 2009, along with her family of husband and two children, to work at the University Centre in Svalbard. By 2011, she was a board member of the school board, the board of city operations and the port authority. Ahead of the 2011 election, in May 2011, she beat Anita Johansen with 15 against 5 votes to become the Labour Party's mayor candidate. Her party won 43 percent of the votes and she was subsequently elected mayor, replacing Kjell Mork. She sits in the municipal council along with her son, Viljar Hanssen, also for the Labour Party.

== Personal life ==
She was married to biologist Sveinn Are Hanssen (born 3 December 1970) from 1991 to 2016. She is now married to Raymond Johansen since 2017. Her sons, Viljar Robert Christian Hanssen (born 4 August 1993) and Torje Hanssen (born 14 July 1997), were on the island of Utøya during 22 July 2011 Norway attacks. Viljar was shot five times in the left hand, right thigh, left shoulder and head near his right eye. Their story on Utøya is featured in the 2018 movie 22 July.
