= Longyear =

Longyear is a surname. Notable people with the surname include:

- Barry B. Longyear (1942–2025), American science fiction author and screenwriter
- Burton Orange Longyear (1868–1969), American botanist and forester
- John Munro Longyear (1850–1922), the founder of Longyearbyen
- John W. Longyear (1820–1875), U.S. Representative from Michigan
- Judith Q. Longyear (1938–1995), mathematician

== See also ==
- Longyearbyen, the largest settlement in Norway's Svalbard archipelago
- Longyear Company, now known as Boart Longyear
- Longyear River, a river on the island of Spitsbergen in Svalbard, Norway
- Longyear Valley, a valley on the island of Spitsbergen in Svalbard, Norway
