= John Longyear =

John Longyear may refer to:

- John W. Longyear (1820–1875), politician from the U.S. state of Michigan
- John Munro Longyear (1850–1922), his son, best known as the founder of Longyearbyen in Svalbard, Norway
