= Nybyen =

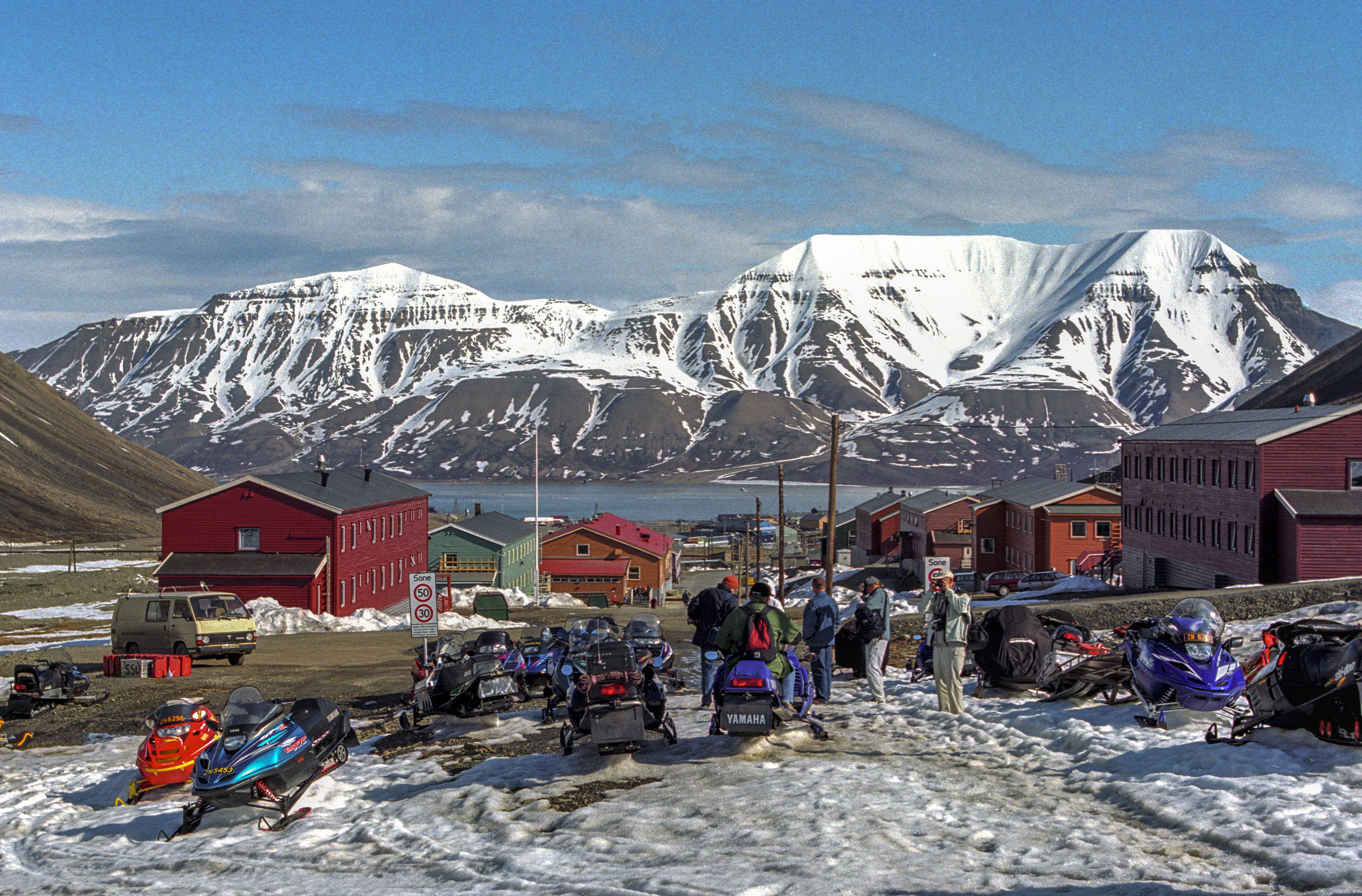
- Nybyen, looking down the valley to Longyearbyen and the Adventfjorden

- Location in western Svalbard
- Coordinates: 78°12′0″N 15°34′0″E
- Sovereign state: Norway
- Territory: Svalbard
- Island: Spitsbergen
- Community: Longyearbyen
- Founded: 1946-7
- Elevation: 100 m (330 ft)

Population (2017)
  - Total: 113
- Postal address: 9171 Longyearbyen

Nybyen is a small settlement located on the southern outskirts of Longyearbyen, on the island of Spitsbergen, in the Svalbard archipelago of Norway. The name is Norwegian and translates as The New Town.

== History and features ==
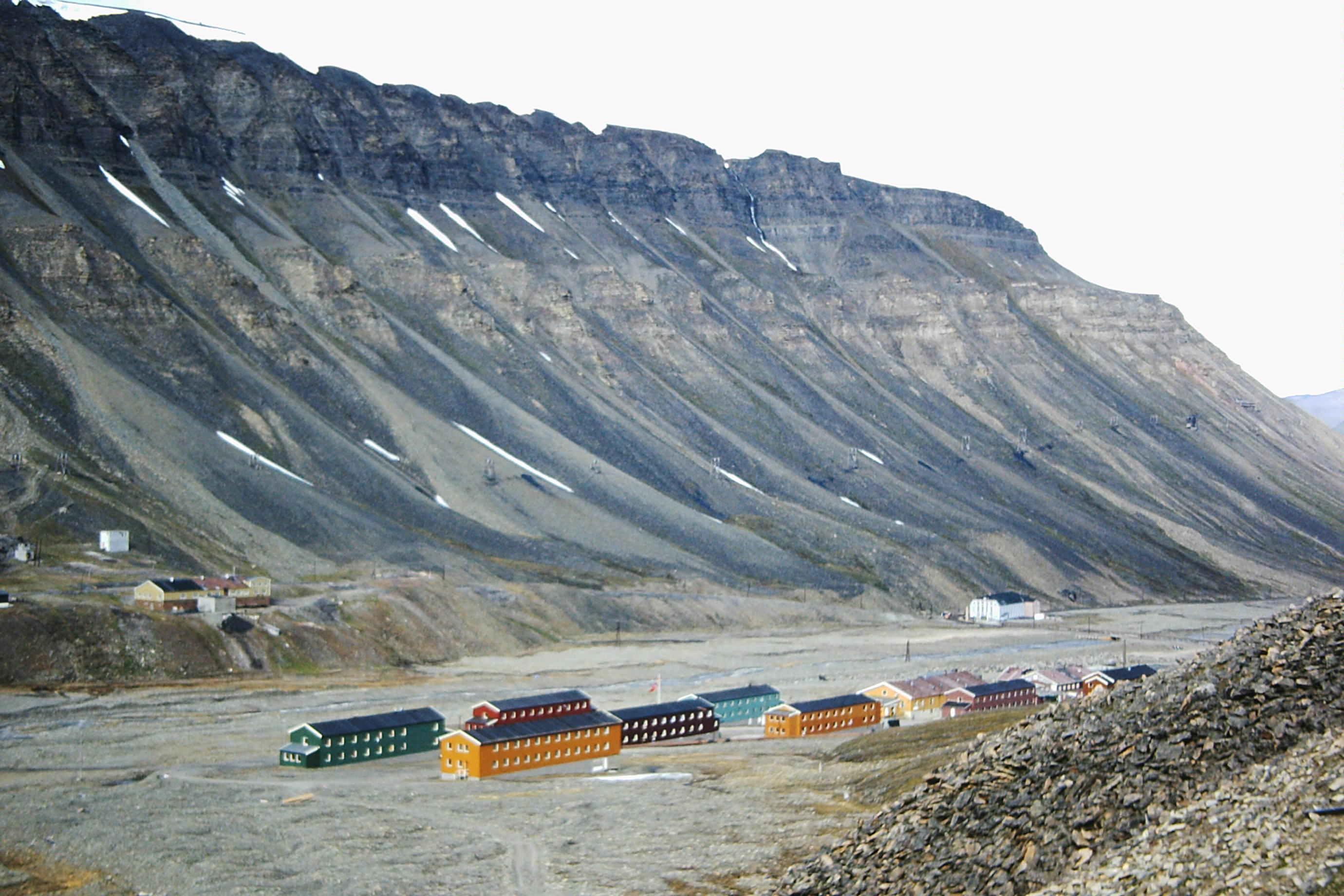
Nybyen, summer 1991

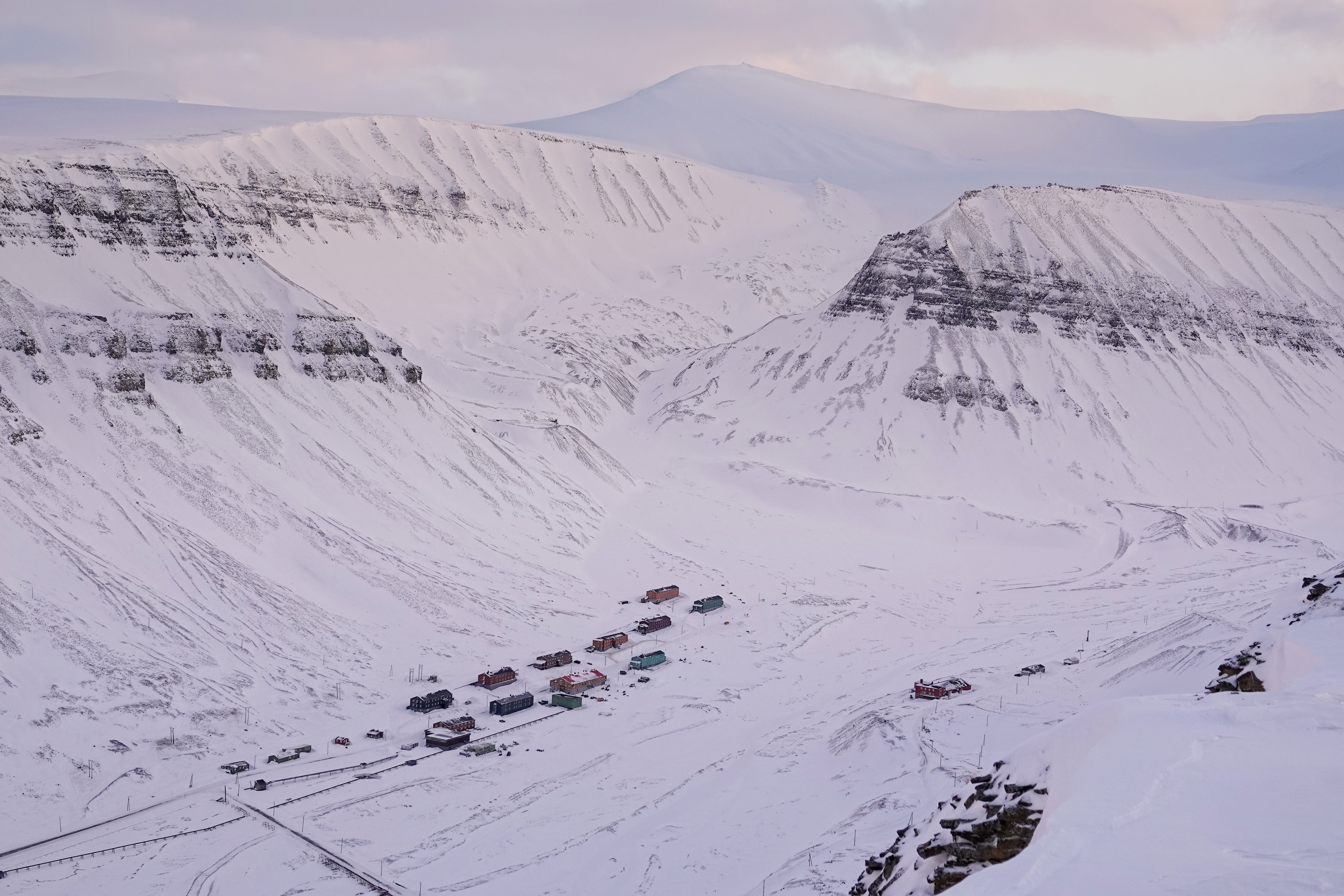
Nybyen to the left, Sverdrupbyen to the right, 2023

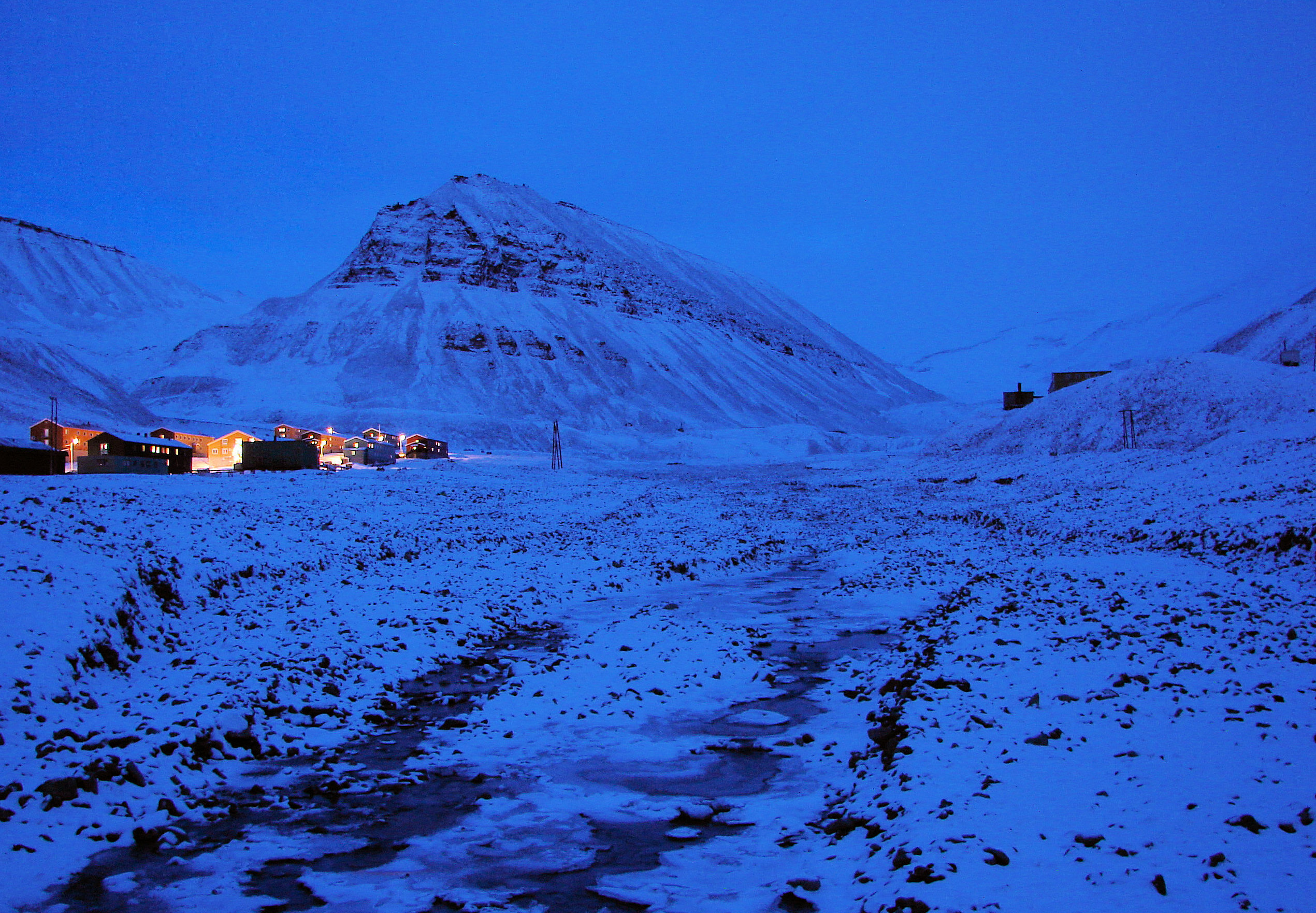
Polar twilight at Nybyen (see Longyearbyen#Climate); the Longyear River is at the centre of the photo, frozen; the Sarkofagen hill dominates the scene

The settlement was founded in 1946-47 for the miners of "mine 2B" (later named Julenissegruva, "Santa Claus Mine"), one of the area's many coal mines. During the second half of the 20th century the "New Town" became a notable part of Longyearbyen, with the town's only shop for a period, though commercial activity has moved back down the valley. Today its character reflects that of Svalbard's more mixed economy (tourism, research and mining) with two guesthouses (Guesthouse 102 and Coal Miners' Cabin) utilising the former miners' barracks, as well as being home to the Svalbard Art Gallery & Craft Centre, and nearby is the Huset Restaurant, club and cinema. Most students at the University Centre in Svalbard (UNIS) lived in six renovated mining barracks in Nybyen. However, since the opening of new student housing in the centre of Longyearbyen, the students no longer live here.

== Geography ==
Nybyen is situated in the upper part of the Longyear Valley, about 2.5 kilometres (1.6 mi) uphill from the centre of Longyearbyen, at an altitude of around 100 metres (330 ft).

Nybyen falls within the community of Longyearbyen (incorporated in 2002) though it is somewhat detached from the town. Between the two settlements is the Longyearbyen School. Svalbard Airport is 6 kilometres (3.7 mi) away and there is a shuttle bus between the airport and the guesthouses. To the south, is a prominent hill named Sarkofagen ("Sarcophagus") which rises to 513 metres (1,683 ft).

=== Sverdrupbyen ===
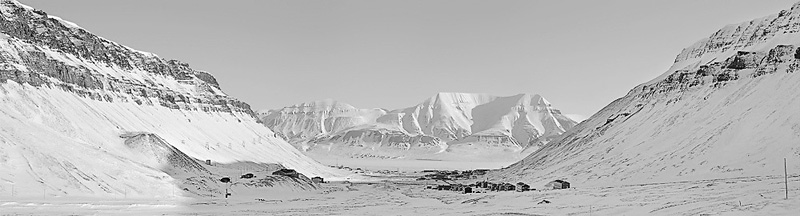
Looking down the Longyear Valley; on the valley floor is Sverdrupbyen (left) and Nybyen (right)

To the west, just on the other side of the river, is a place called Sverdrupbyen, named after Einar Sverdrup (1895–1942), the managing director of the mining company Store Norske Spitsbergen Kulkompani. He was the leader of Operation Fritham in World War II, but died in the course of that operation, which attempted to secure Svalbard for the Allies. Nybyen is sometimes alternatively known as Østre Sverdrupbyen ("East Sverdrupbyen"). Most buildings in Sverdrupbyen, including those of Mine 1B, were destroyed in a fire drill in the 1980s before they became protected under the cultural heritage preservation law.
