= Longyear Building =

- U.S. National Register of Historic Places
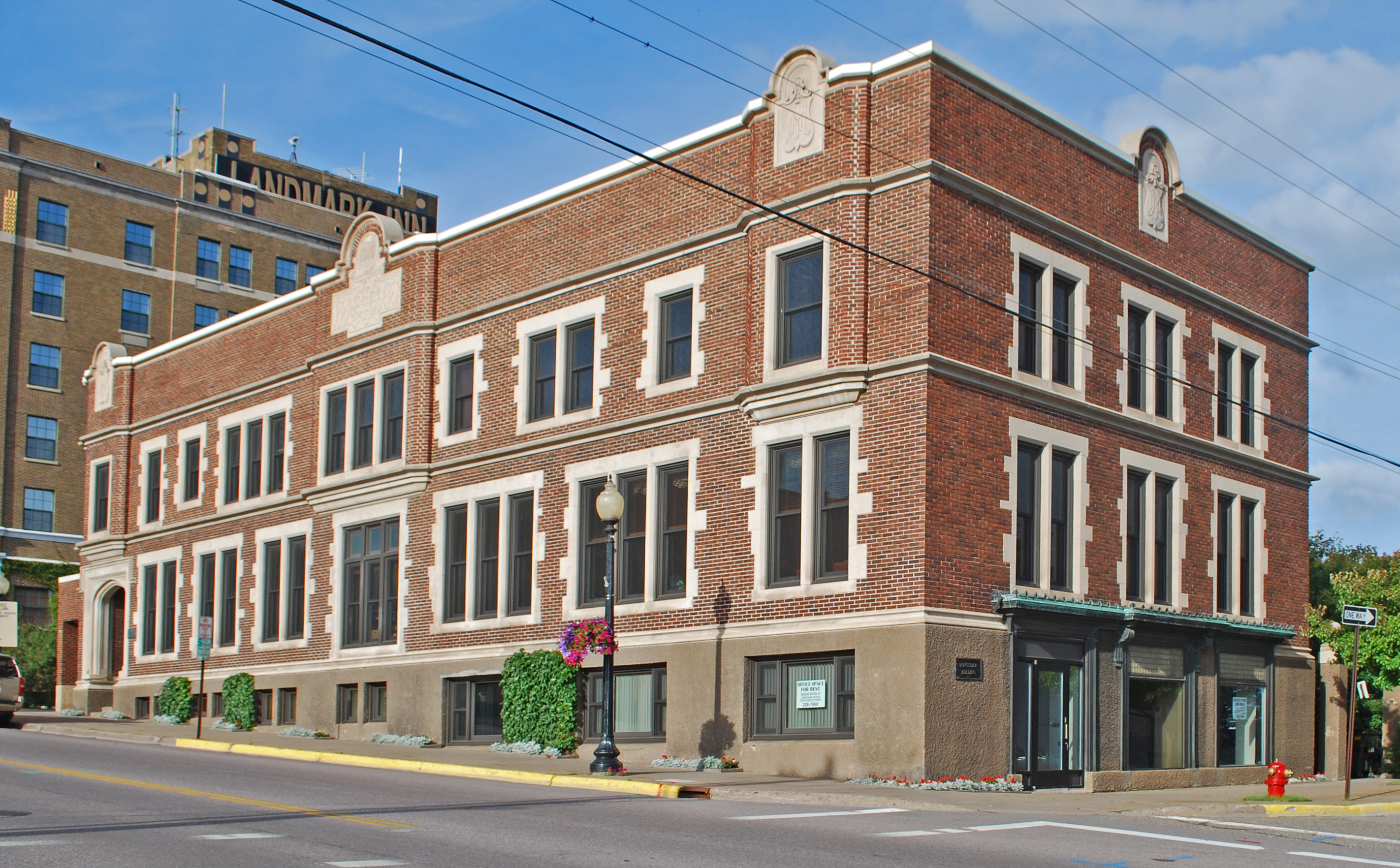
- Longyear Building from across the street

- Location within Michigan
- Interactive map
- Location: 210 North Front St., Marquette, Michigan
- Coordinates: 46°32′40″N 87°23′32″W
- Built: 1916
- Built by: John Simon Wahlman
- Architect: Demetrius Frederick Charlton
- Architectural style: Tudor Revival
- NRHP reference No.: 04000657
- Added to NRHP: July 01, 2004

The Longyear Building is a commercial structure located at 210 North Front Street in Marquette, Michigan. It was listed on the National Register of Historic Places in 2004.

== History ==
John Munro Longyear was born in 1850 to of Lansing attorney and U.S. Congressman John W. Longyear. John M. left school at age fifteen and worked at a variety of jobs coming to Marquette in 1873. Between 1873 and 1878, Longyear assessed the value of timber and mineral resources on land throughout the Upper Peninsula for a variety of clients. In 1878 the Lake Superior Ship Canal, Railway and Iron Company hired him as a land agent to assess the land they had been granted. Soon Frederick Ayer, the controlling partner of the company, hired Longyear to find and buy land for his personal investment, offering Longyear half interest in the land. Through this and similar partnerships, Longyear amassed a large amount of land that he personally controlled. In 1890, he branched into mining interests, as well as timber and financial investments.

Longyear was also elected as mayor of Marquette in 1890 and 1891, and supported numerous philanthropies in the city. However, in 1900 the city of Marquette supported plans to build a railroad line along the shoreline in front of the Longyear home, and Longyear moved both his family and his mansion to Brookline, Massachusetts. The Longyear business was still headquartered in Marquette, and Longyear would often travel back and forth.

By 1915, Longyear's staff in Marquette was outgrowing their offices in the Marquette National Bank Building. Longyear decided to construct his own office building, and purchased a lot, then occupied by a boarding house, on the corner of Front and Bluff Streets. He hired the architectural firm of Charlton and Kuenzli to design the office building and John Simon Wahlman as a general contractor. Construction of the Longyear Building began in late spring 1916 and the structure was complete by early 1917. The structure included ground level retail space, accessed from Bluff Street, general and private offices for Longyear's firm on the first floor, and three suites of rooms on the second floor. These were used by John Longyear himself, his business guests, and a caretaker.

John Longyear continued to use the building until his death in 1922. His estate was divided into three companies: Longyear Corporation, Longyear Estate, Inc., and Longyear Realty Corporation, which were controlled by Longyear's wife Mary, their children, and Longyear's sister. However, the various holdings of these companies fluctuated in value through the twentieth century, as mining, timber, and land interest became more or less valuable. In 1951/52 Longyear Corporation and Longyear Estate, Inc. were folded into Longyear Realty Corporation, and in turn in 1964 a new limited partnership called J. M. Longyear Heirs was formed to manage Longyear Realty and other holdings. Throughout this time the Longyear companies continued to use this building.

In 2001, JML Heirs, LLC, a company founded by John Munro Longyear, undertook an extensive renovation of the building. The company has its corporate offices in the building.

== Description ==
The Longyear Building is a two-story rectangular Tudor Revival brick office building with a flat roof. The building lot is sloped, so that the ground floor is below grade at one end and fully exposed, with a street level entrance and storefront windows, at the other end. A small 2001 addition at one end houses an elevator. The building sits on a concrete foundation, and the basement level is clad in stucco. The remainder of the exterior walls are brownish brick backed by hollow clay tile. The two main facades have extensive Indiana Limestone trim for the water table, belt courses, window trim with quoins, decorative cartouches, and Tudor arch main entrance. A decorative copper cornice is located above the storefront windows and doorway on one end.

The main facade contains the entryway to the Longyear offices on the first floor level. The entry is recessed, and accessed through a limestone Tudor arch with a rectangular hoodmold. Surrounding windows on the first floor are asymmetrically arranged and grouped in pairs and threes. The second floor is separated into three shallow bays. There are single windows in each of the end bays and a triple window in the center. A parapet wall encircles the top of the building.

On the interior, there is a vestibule with original terrazzo floor, with double door leading to a short hall with the main staircase and the entrance to the Longyear offices. The lower floor houses rental space accessed by the Bluff Street entrance and storage, mechanical equipment room, break room, and restrooms for the Longyear Company. The first floor contains the Longyear Company offices, which are arranged along a central corridor. The space includes primarily offices, and also a reception area, work room, conference room, and vault. The doors, sidelights, transoms, door trim, and window trim along the central corridor are almost all original to the construction of the building. The second floor of the building, which is now leased as office space, is similar in plan to the first floor. The second floor was originally constructed as apartments, but were converted to offices space in the late 1960s, apparently without a major change to the floor plan. A small flight of stairs leads from the second floor up to the attic, which is used for storage.
