= Store Norske =

Store Norske (literally meaning Great Norwegian) may refer to:

- Store Norske Spitsbergen Kulkompani, a mining company in Svalbard
- Store norske leksikon, an encyclopedia
