= Oxygenic photogranules =

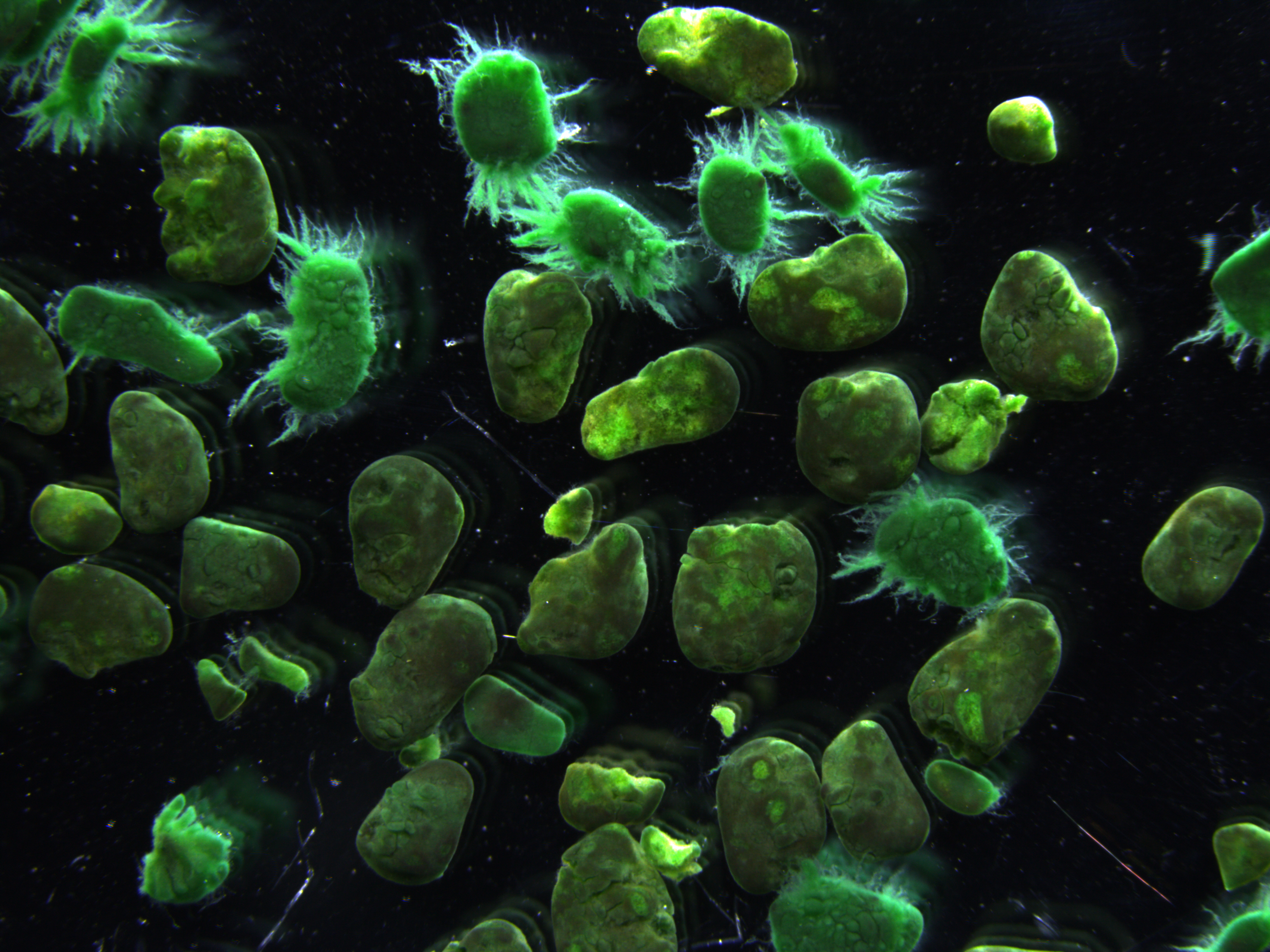
Oxygenic photogranules from a SBR reactor.

Oxygenic photogranules (OPGs) are a type of biological aggregate with an approximately spherical form, typically from a millimeter to a centimeter scale. OPGs are characterized by the cloth-like layer of phototrophic organisms, predominantly filamentous cyanobacteria of the order Oscillatoriales. Oxygen production by these phototrophs through photosynthesis is typically coupled to oxygen consumption of heterotrophic biomass, releasing CO_{2} that is presumably utilised in a syntrophic relationship by autotrophic phototrophs.

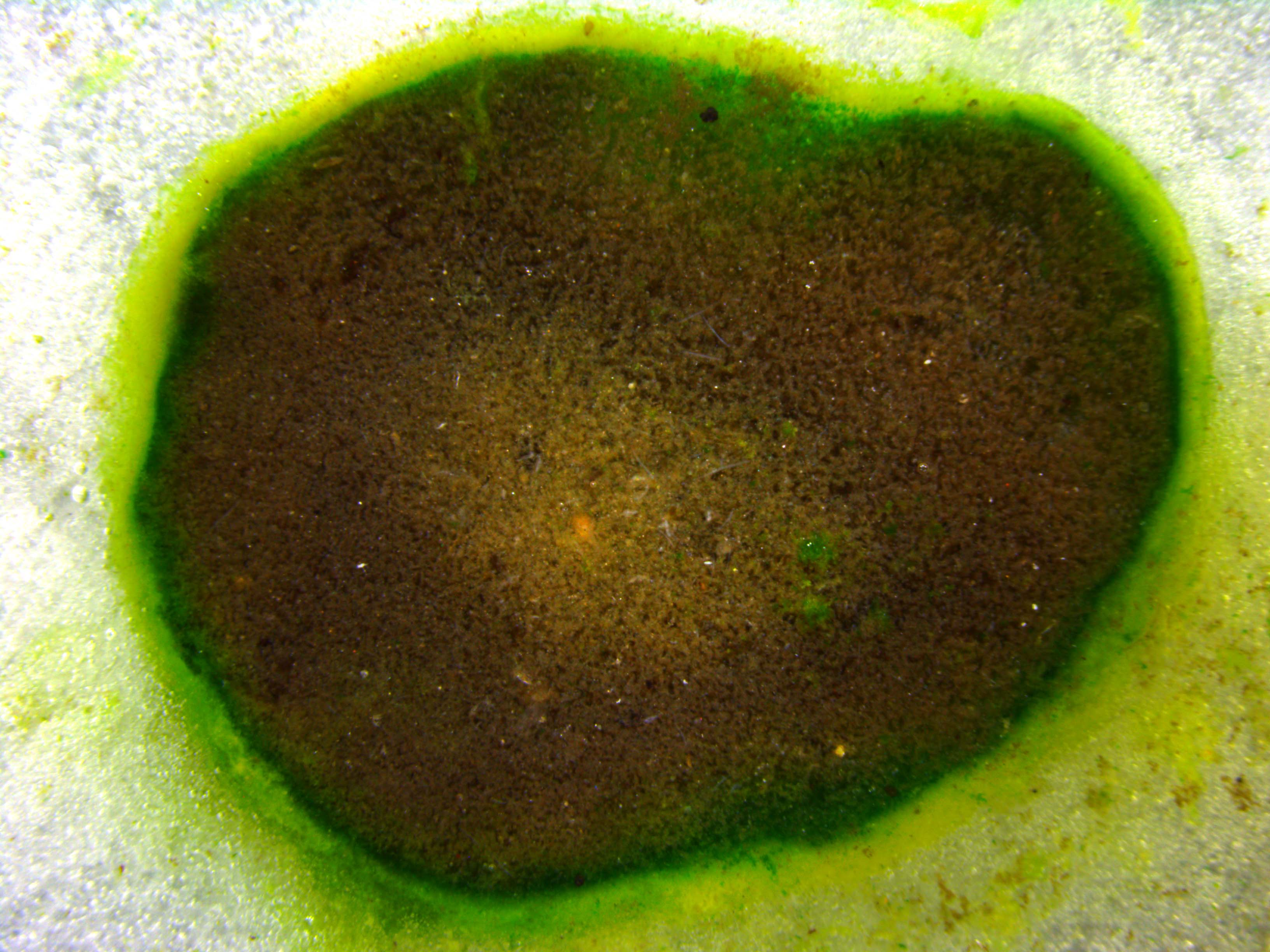
Cross section of an OPG cultivated under static conditions

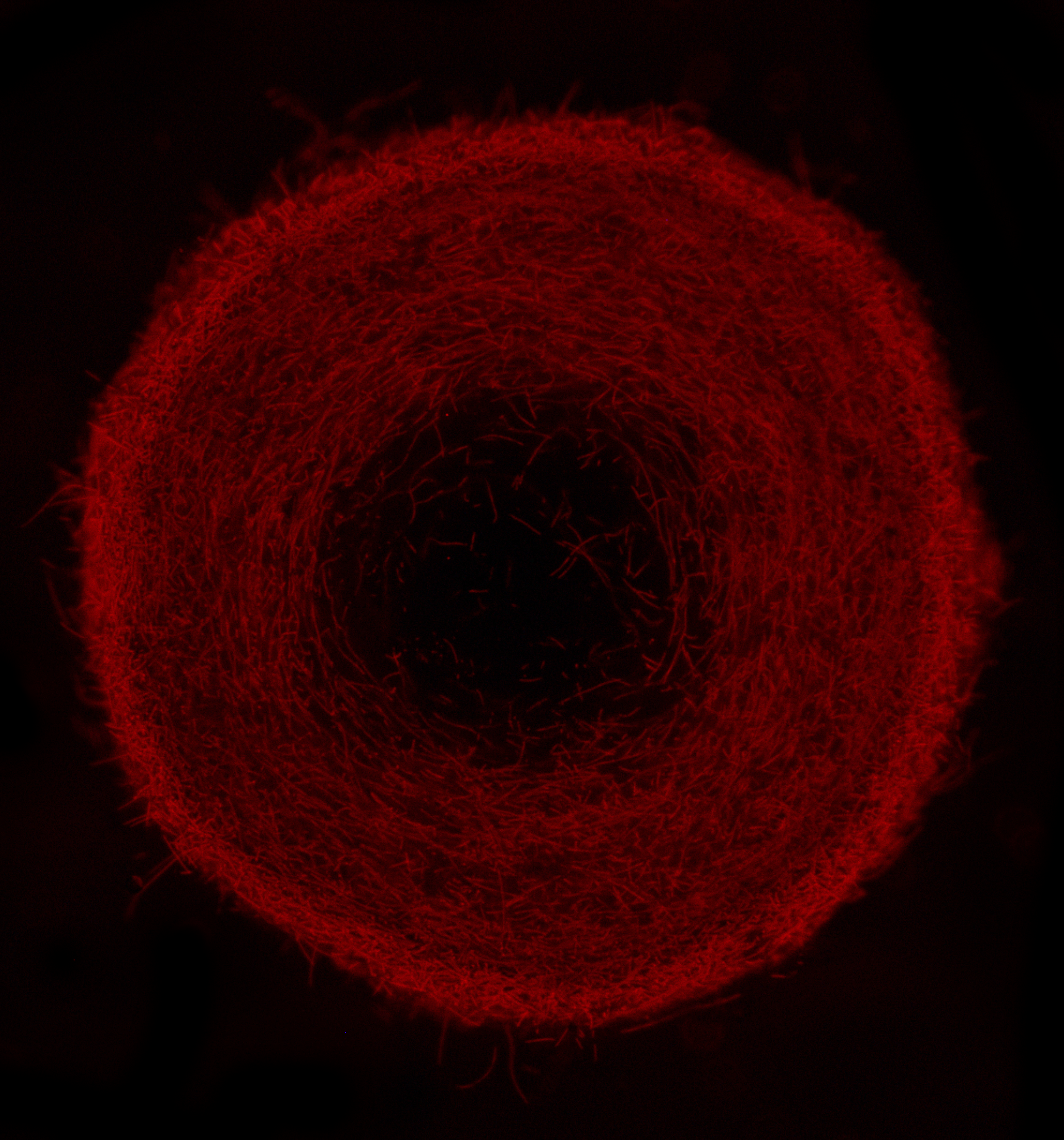
Cross section of an OPG under fluorescence light

== Discovery/Context ==
In 2011, Park and Dolan first observed the transformation of activated sludge into oxygenic photogranule (OPG)., when incubated in unagitated and sealed vials exposed to natural light for several months. Since then, this static cultivation of OPG was observed with activated sludge coming from various places over the world in several laboratories (, etc.).
OPGs were discovered recently and serendipitously in laboratory conditions, but very similar granules, called cryoconites, are found in glaciers

== Formation of oxygenic photogranules ==
Anaerobic and aerobic granule formation are typically postulated to be driven by hydrodynamic shear and washout. Oxygenic photogranules do form when exposed to hydrodynamic shear in sequencing batch reactors; however, they also form under static batch^{&}. They can form over the course of several weeks from a source of activated sludge exposed to light. How oxygenic photogranules form is far from understood, but filamentous and motile cyanobacteria seem to play an essential role in their formation. Cyanobacteria are enriched from the activated sludge and form the outer layer of photogranules that gives structural integrity for both photogranules generated under hydrodynamic and static conditions.
This hypothesis is supported by the finding that the initial presence of inorganic nitrogen in the activated sludge inoculum promotes cyanobacterial growth over microalgal growth, resulting in successful oxygenic photogranules.
Oxygenic photogranule formation is thus not driven by hydrodynamic shear and washout is not required for the formation of oxygenic photogranules, even though these factors may play an important role when applied. Filamentous, motile cyanobacteria play a key role, but exact mechanisms have to be elucidated to be able to control the formation and properties of oxygenic photogranules and apply them to bioengineering processes.

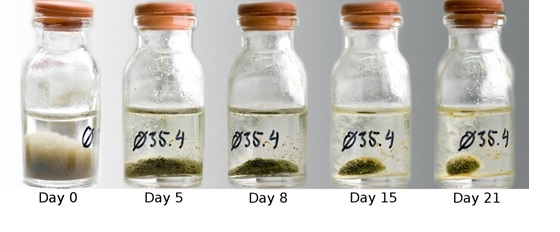
Temporal progression of photogranulation under static conditions.

== Oxygenic photogranules applied to wastewater treatment ==
Oxygenic photogranules are a new type of biogranules that have not been applied in bioengineering processes yet. but has promising potentials to be applied in wastewater treatment. OPG has been applied in turbulently mixed sequencing batch reactors SBR and in high-rate algal ponds. Oxygenic photogranules have the ability to couple oxygen production through photosynthesis to conversion of organic matter into carbon dioxide by heterotrophs. Therefore, they have the potential to treat wastewater without an external source of aeration and to generate energy when this biodegradable biofeedstock is used for anaerobic digestion

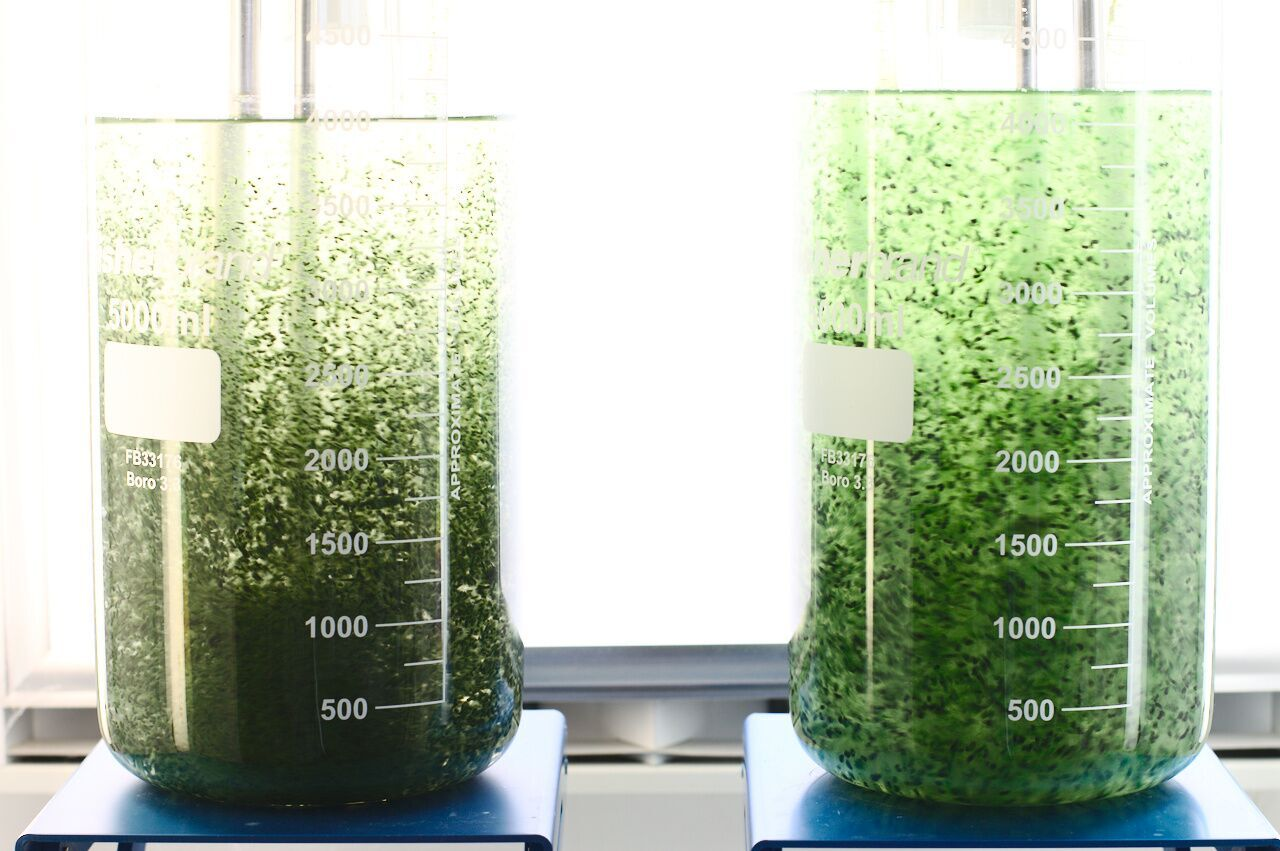
SBR Reactor, with Oxygenic photogranules
