= Arctic Coal Company =

1906–1916 American coal mining company operating in Svalbard, Norway

- Industry: Mining
- Founded: 1906
- Defunct: 1916
- Fate: Bought by Store Norske Spitsbergen Kulkompani
- Successor: Store Norske Spitsbergen Kulkompani
- Headquarters: Boston, United States
- Area served: Svalbard
- Products: Coal
- Owner: John Munro Longyear; Frederick Ayer

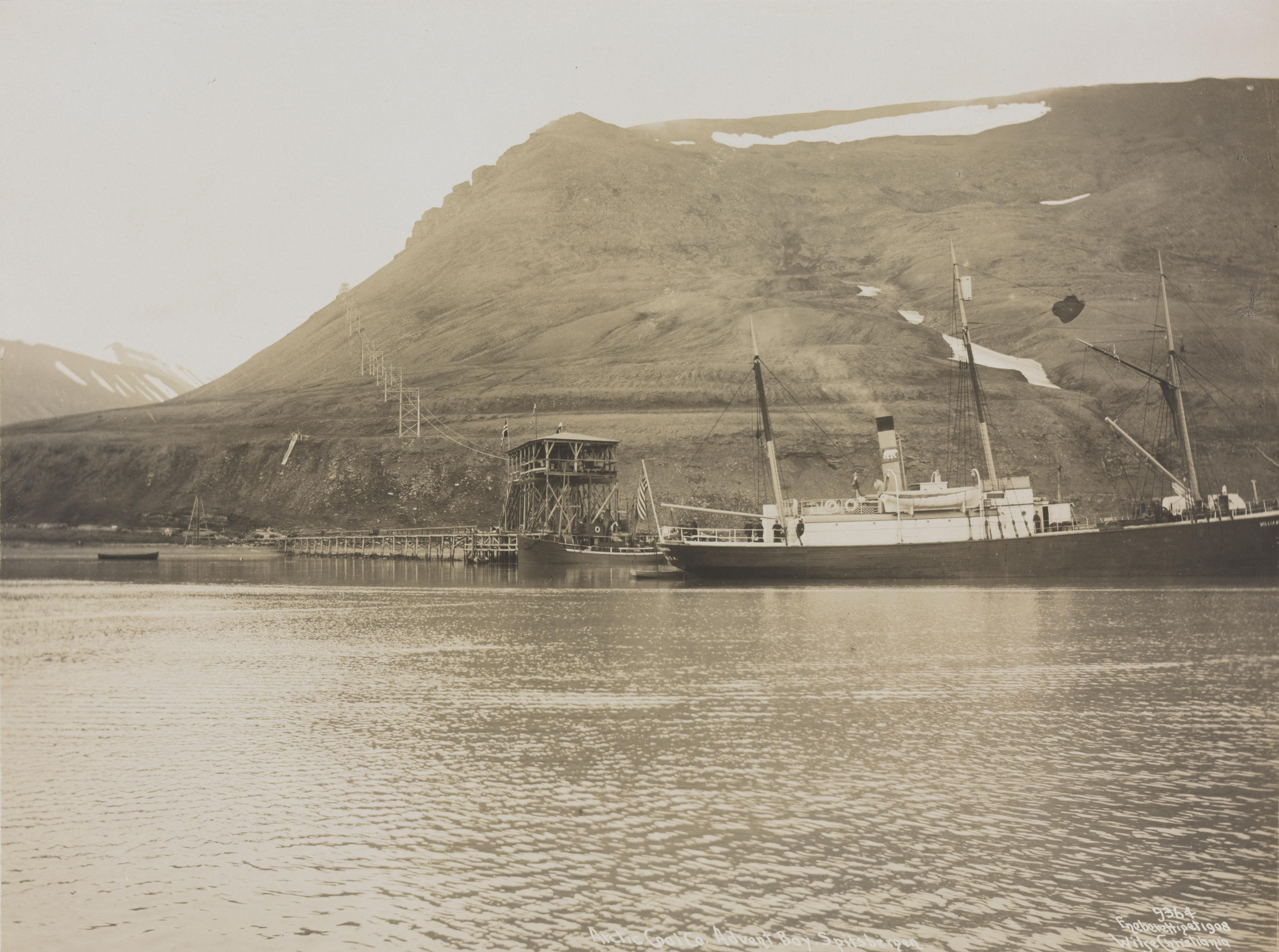

Arctic Coal Company was a coal mining company that operated mines at Longyearbyen (then Longyear City) in Svalbard between 1906 and 1916.

The American industrialist John Munro Longyear visited Spitsbergen as a tourist in 1901, where he met with an expedition prospecting for coal. He returned to Spitsbergen 1903, where he met Henrik B. Næss in Adventfjorden, who gave him samples and information on coal fields. Along with his associate Frederick Ayer, Longyear bought the Norwegian claims on the west side of Adventfjorden, installed William D. Munroe as general manager, and expanded the claims significantly the following year. In 1906, the Boston-based Arctic Coal Company, with Ayer and Longyear as the main shareholders, started mining in Mine 1a, after having built docks and housing. The company had American administration, but mostly Norwegian laborers, and named the town Longyear City. Coal was transported the 1.2 kilometers (0.75 mi) from the mine to the port using an aerial tramway built by the German company Adolf Bleichert & Co. of Leipzig. In 1913, the company started preliminary work to open Mine 2a. Following financial difficulties during the First World War, the mining operations were bought by Store Norske Spitsbergen Kulkompani, which was incorporated in Oslo on 30 November 1916.
