= Longyear Hall of Pedagogy =

- Longyear Hall of Pedagogy-Northern Michigan University
- Formerly listed on the U.S. National Register of Historic Places
- Michigan State Historic Site
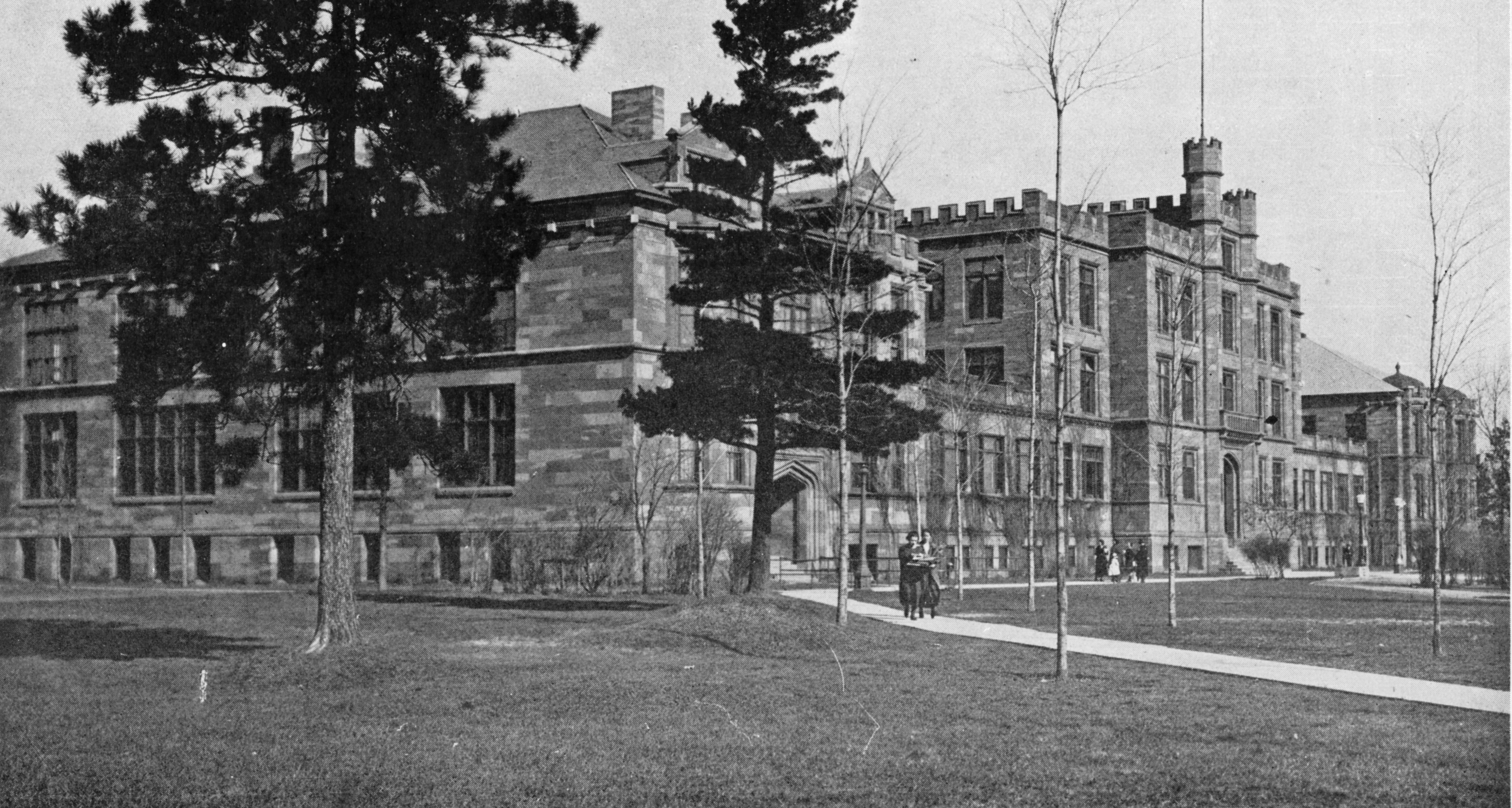
- Kaye Hall Complex, including Longyear Hall in the foreground

- Location within Michigan Location within the United States
- Interactive map
- Location: Presque Isle Ave., Marquette, Michigan
- Coordinates: 46°33′22″N 87°23′52″W
- Built: 1906
- Architect: Ernest W. Arnold
- Architectural style: Tudor Revival, Early Tudor Gothic Revival
- Demolished: 1993
- NRHP reference No.: 80001880

Significant dates
- Added to NRHP: April 03, 1980
- Designated MSHS: April 14, 1972
- Removed from NRHP: October 17, 2022

The Longyear Hall of Pedagogy (also known as just Longyear Hall) was an academic building located on Presque Isle Avenue, on the campus of Northern Michigan University in Marquette, Michigan. It was designated a Michigan State Historic Site in 1972 as part of the Kaye Hall Complex, and individually listed on the National Register of Historic Places in 1980, but was demolished in 1993 and removed from the National Register of Historic Places in 2022.

== History ==
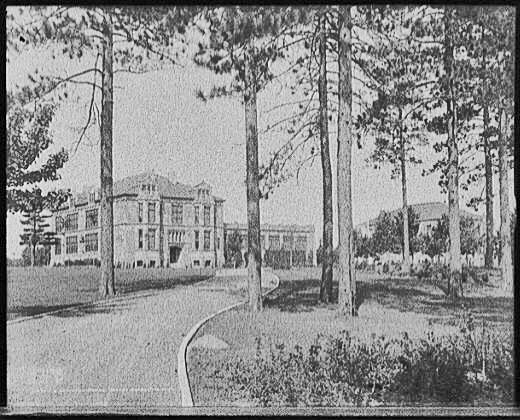
Longyear Hall c. 1908

The original Longyear Hall, named for prominent Marquette real estate developer and early Northern Michigan Normal School patron John Munro Longyear, was constructed in 1900, the year after Northern was founded. This building burned down in 1905. A second Longyear Building, a reconstruction of the original, was built in 1907, based on a design by Battle Creek architect E. W. Arnold. Longyear Hall was used to house administration offices, classrooms, and the library.

In 1915, Kaye Hall was built, which connected Longyear Hall with the nearby Peter White Science Hall (1902) to form a three-building complex. An addition to the Longyear Hall, housing athletic facilities, was built in 1933. In 1972, Kaye Hall and the Peter White Science Hall were demolished. Longyear Hall was abandoned in 1975 when administrative offices were moved, and the structure was never used again. Despite being listed on the National Register of Historic Places in 1980, Longyear Hall was torn down in 1993.

== Description ==
The Longyear Hall of Pedagogy was a rectangular two-and-one-half-story structure built with a steel frame sheathed with local Marquette brownstone, with a hipped roof and gabled dormers. The front entrance was topped by a bank of three rectangular windows and flanked by two-story bay windows. A stone beltcourse ran between the first and second stories, and a dentil cornice edged the top of the structure.
