= Cape Amsterdam =

Headland in Spitsbergen, Svalbard

Coordinates: 77.858°N 16.652°E

Cape Amsterdam (Norwegian: Kapp Amsterdam) is a headland in Nordenskiöld Land on Spitsbergen on Svalbard. Headland marks the northwestern entrance to Svea Gulf that continues north to Sveagruva.

Cape Amsterdam is 15 km from Sveagruva and shipping port of the Store Norske Spitsbergen Kulkompani. The coal is transported by trucks from there to the quay. In March 2011 there was a coal fire in a pile of around 80,000 tons of coal at Cape Amsterdam.

In September 1946, listed building workers from Sveagruva built a beacon at the entrance to Sveagruva. The Lykta was operational from 17 September that year.

Cape Amsterdam is named after the Swedish company A / B Svea steamship Amsterdam that anchored in the area on 11 August 1917.
