= Cryoconite =

Dark biogenic surface dust on snow and ice

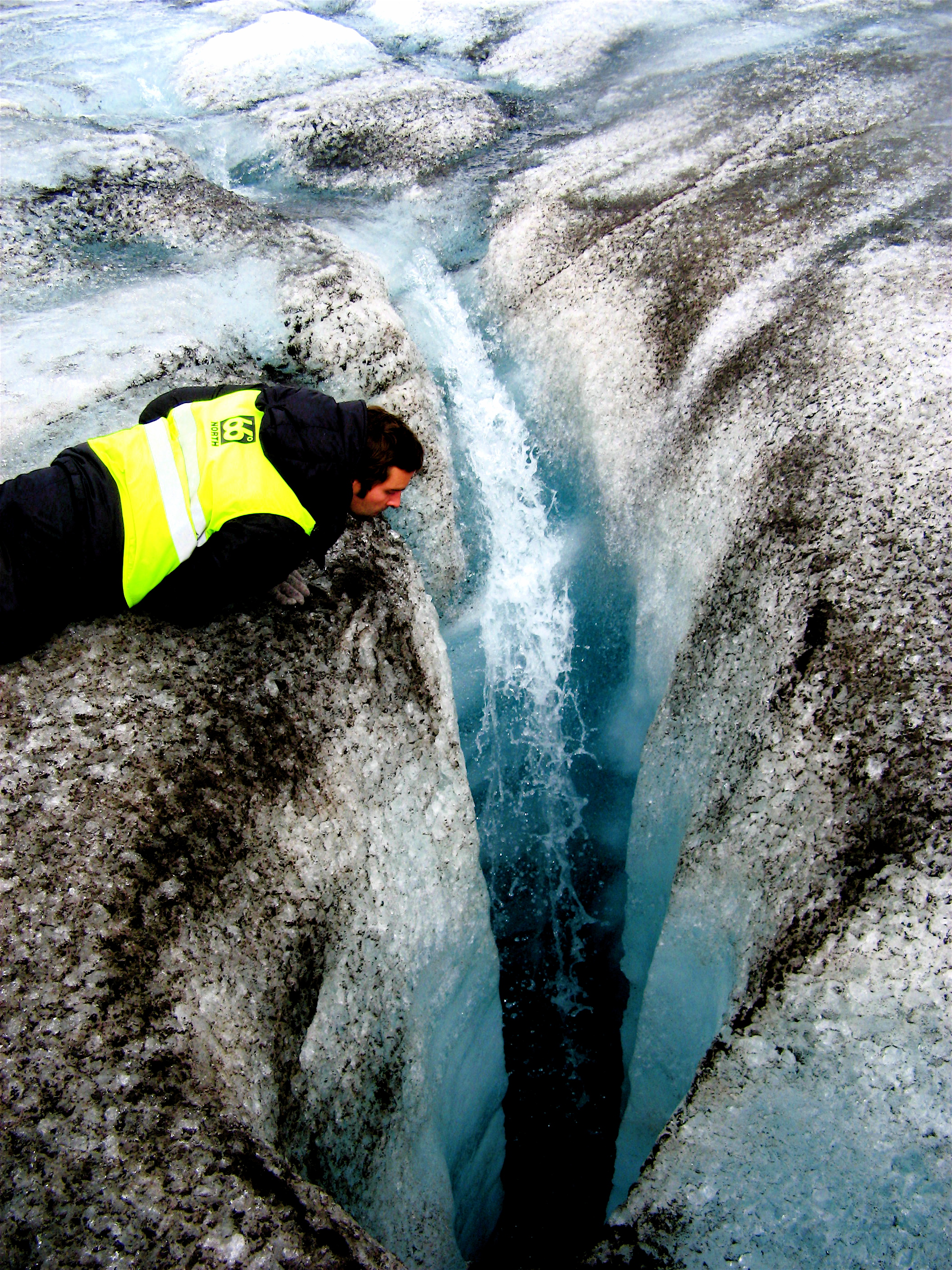
A layer of cryoconite on the surface of a glacier.

Cryoconite is powdery windblown dust made of a combination of small rock particles, soot and microbes which is deposited and builds up on snow, glaciers, or ice caps. The darkening, especially from small amounts of soot, absorbs solar radiation melting the snow or ice beneath the deposit, and sometimes creating a cryoconite hole. Cryoconite may contain dust from far away continental deserts or farmland, particles from volcanic eruptions or power plant emissions, and soot. It was first described and named by Nils A. E. Nordenskiöld when he traveled on Greenland's icecap in 1870. During summer, cryoconite holes frequently contain liquid water and thus provide a niche for cold-adapted microorganisms like bacteria, algae and animals like rotifers. Cryoconite typically settles and concentrates at the bottom of these holes creating a noticeable dark mass.

Soot decreases the reflectivity, or albedo of ice, increasing absorption of heat. Cryoconite is constantly being added to snow and ice formations along with snow. It is buried within the snow or ice, but as the snow or ice melts increasing amounts of dark material is exposed on the surface, accelerating melting.

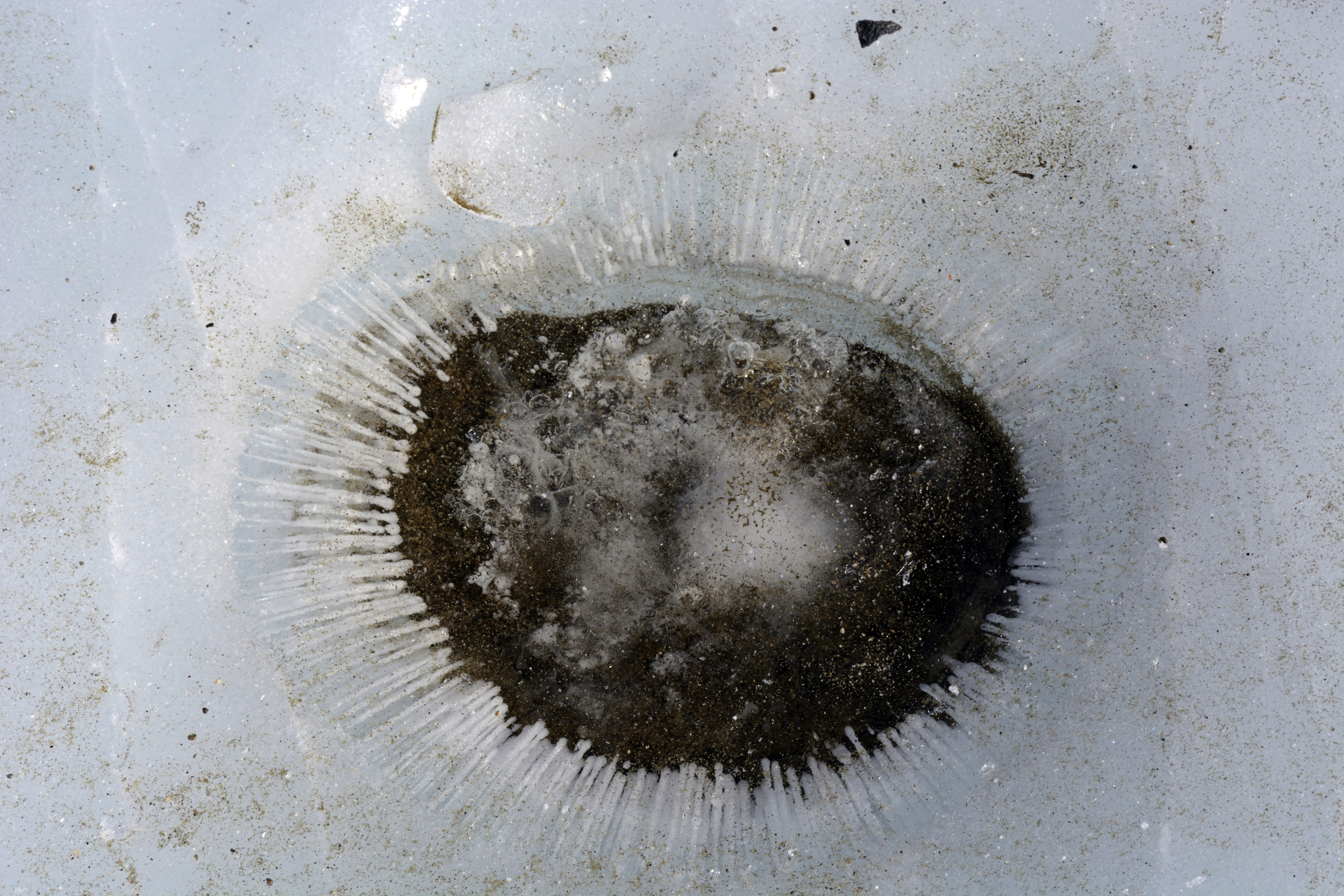
Cryoconite hole, Taylor Glacier

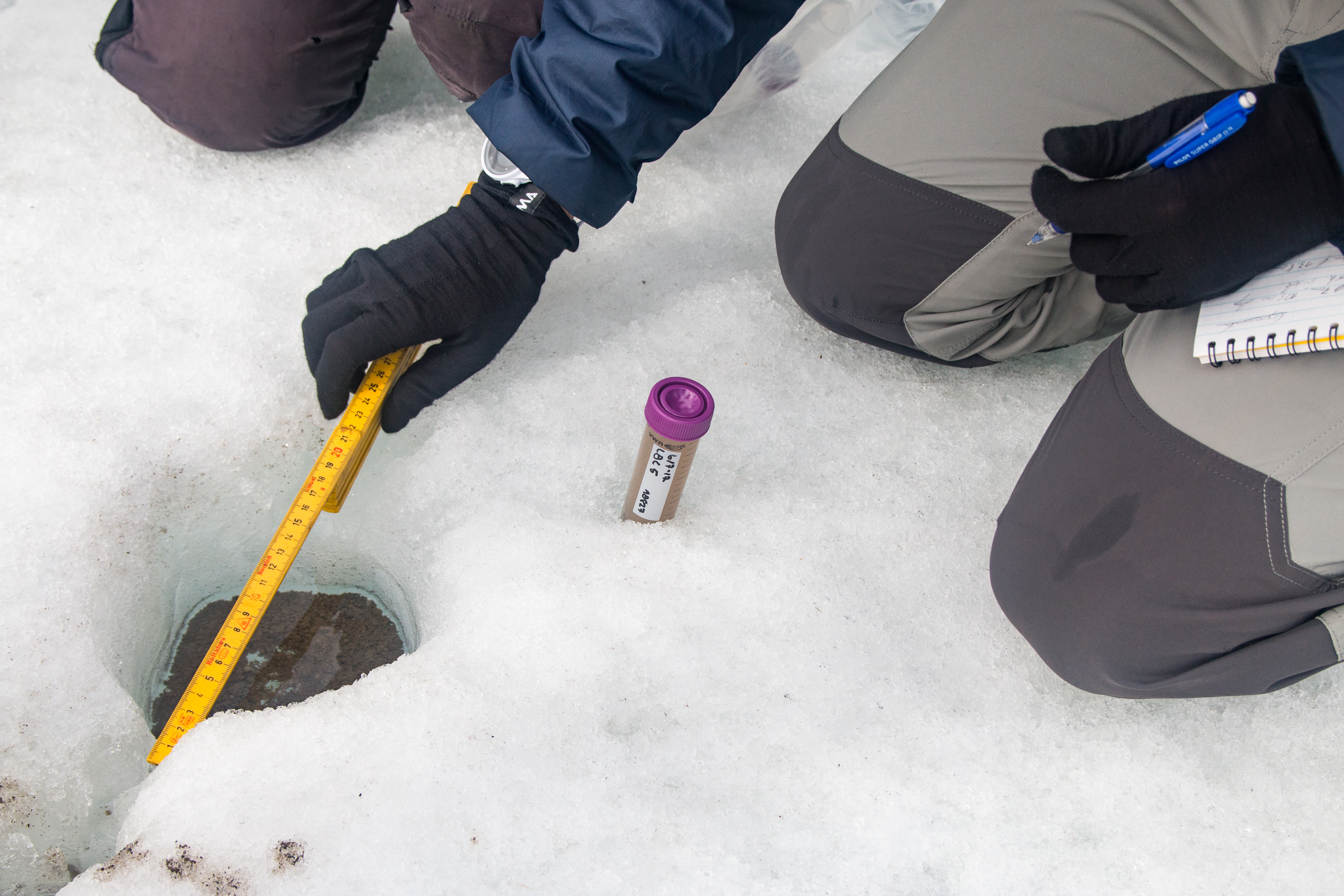
Measuring a cryoconite hole, Longyearbreen Glacier (Longyear Valley)

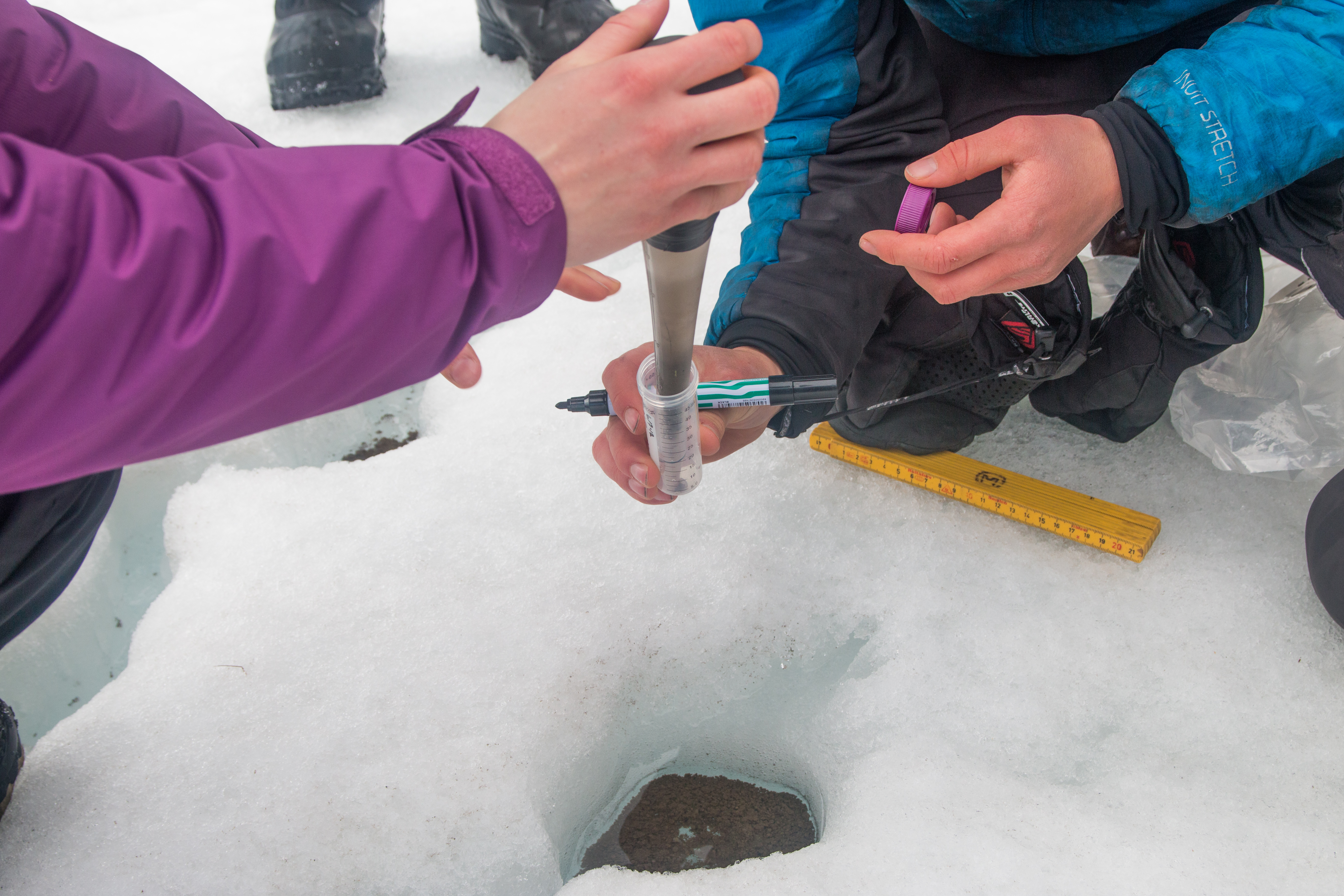
Taking a sample, Longyearbreen Glacier

== External links and further reading ==
- Woods Hole Image of the Day: Attack of the cryoconites
