= Ross Wilkins =

American judge

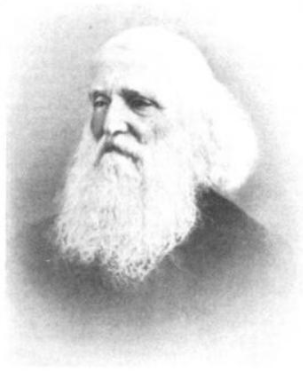

Judge of the United States District Court for the Eastern District of Michigan
- In office February 24, 1863 – February 18, 1870
- Appointed by: operation of law
- Preceded by: Seat established by 12 Stat. 660
- Succeeded by: John W. Longyear

Judge of the United States District Court for the District of Michigan
- In office January 26, 1837 – February 24, 1863
- Appointed by: Andrew Jackson
- Preceded by: Seat established by 5 Stat. 61
- Succeeded by: Seat abolished

Personal details
- Born: Ross Wilkins; February 19, 1799 Pittsburgh, Pennsylvania
- Died: May 17, 1872 (aged 73) Detroit, Michigan
- Resting place: Elmwood Cemetery; Detroit
- Parent: John Wilkins Jr. (father)
- Relatives: William Wilkins
- Education: Dickinson College read law

Ross Wilkins (February 19, 1799 – May 17, 1872) was a United States district judge of the United States District Court for the District of Michigan and the United States District Court for the Eastern District of Michigan.

== Education and career ==
Born on February 19, 1799, in Pittsburgh, Pennsylvania, Wilkins graduated from Dickinson College in 1816 and read law in 1820. He was a prosecutor in Pittsburgh from 1821 to 1823. He entered private practice in Pittsburgh from 1823 to 1832. He was a member of the Pennsylvania House of Representatives from 1829 to 1830.

== Federal judicial service ==
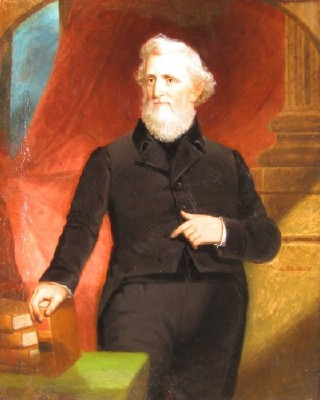
Judicial portrait of Wilkins, 1888, by A. Bradish.

Wilkins was appointed by President Jackson as a Judge of the United States District Court for the District of Michigan Territory, on April 26, 1832, serving from 1832 to 1837, and opening his first term of court on June 17, 1832. He was recorder for Detroit, Michigan, in 1837.

Following the admission of the State of Michigan to the Union on January 26, 1837, Wilkins was nominated by President Andrew Jackson on July 2, 1836, to the United States District Court for the District of Michigan, to a new seat authorized by 5 Stat. 61. He was confirmed by the United States Senate on July 2, 1836, and received his commission on January 26, 1837. Wilkins was reassigned by operation of law to the United States District Court for the Eastern District of Michigan on February 24, 1863, to a new seat authorized by 12 Stat. 660. His service terminated on February 18, 1870, due to his retirement. He never missed a term of court during his entire service on the court.

=== Recommendation ===
John M. Snowden, who stood high in favor with President Jackson, recommended Wilkins for appointment to the office of district court judge. Shortly afterwards a friend of another applicant for the same office appeared before the President and denounced the man recommended by Mr. Snowden, as being utterly unfit for the place. Old Hickory, with eyes flashing fire, roared out: "How dare you say that? Do you think John M. Snowden would recommend a man unfit for the position? No, never by the eternal!"

=== Other service ===
Wilkins was also a member of the convention that drafted the Michigan Constitution of 1835, and also of the two conventions held in 1836 to accept terms imposed on Michigan statehood by Congress (see the Toledo War). He also served on the Board of Regents for the University of Michigan, from its creation in 1837 until 1842.

== Later service and death ==
Wilkins was a retired attorney in Detroit from 1869 to 1872. He died there on May 17, 1872, and was interred at Elmwood Cemetery.

== Family ==
Wilkins was the son of Major General John Wilkins Jr., who served in both the Revolutionary War and the War of 1812, and became the 7th Quartermaster General of the United States Army. His uncle was William Wilkins, a notable lawyer, jurist and politician in Pennsylvania.

== See also ==
- List of United States federal judges by longevity of service

Legal offices
Preceded by Seat established by 5 Stat. 61	Judge of the United States District Court for the District of Michigan; 1837–1863	Succeeded by Seat abolished
Preceded by Seat established by 12 Stat. 660	Judge of the United States District Court for the Eastern District of Michigan; 1863–1870	Succeeded by John W. Longyear
