= University Centre in Svalbard =

Norwegian state-owned limited company established in 1993

- Universitetssenteret på Svalbard AS
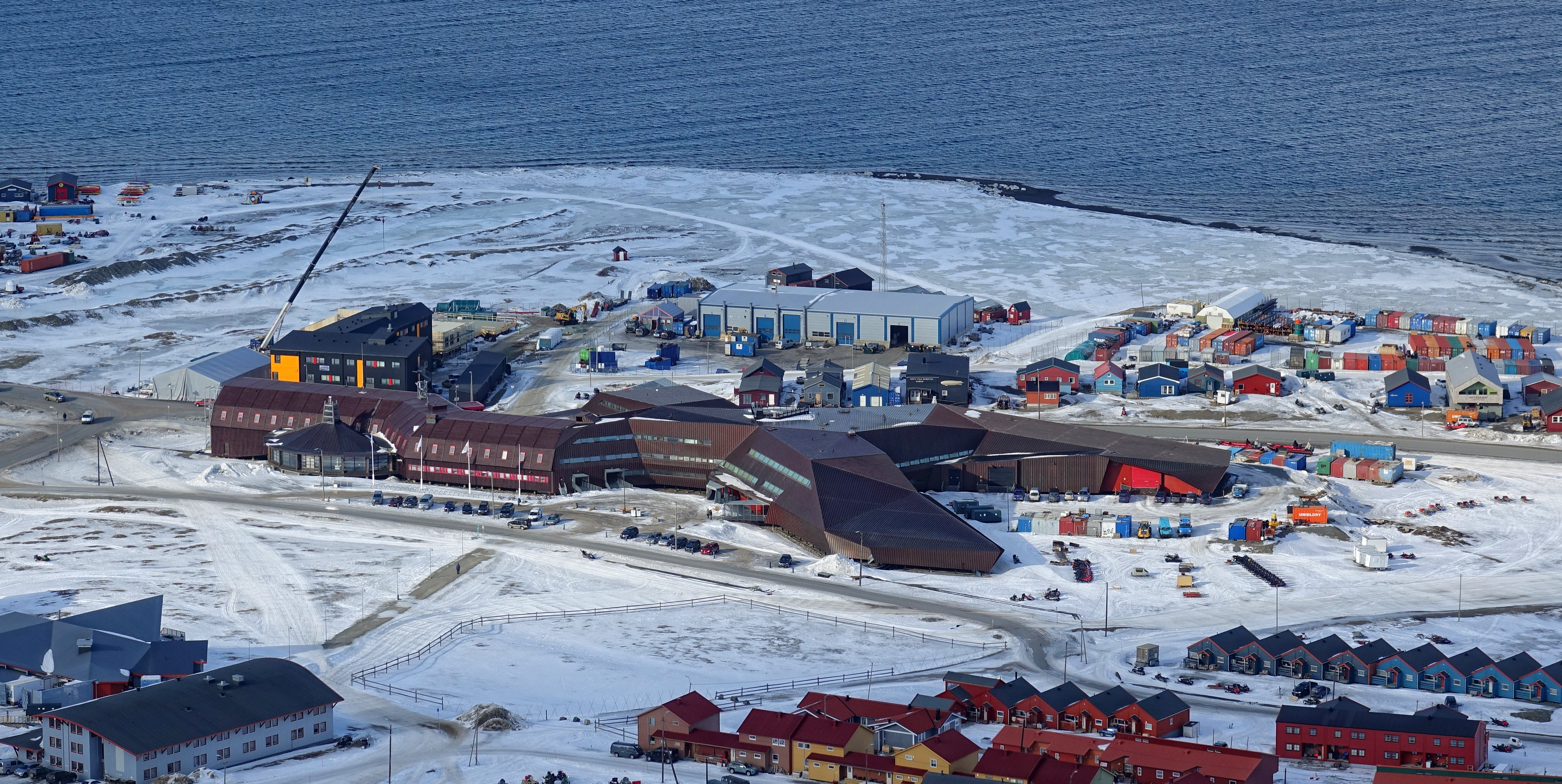
- Type: Limited company
- Established: 1993
- Affiliations: University of the Arctic
- Director: Jøran Moen
- Academic staff: 61 (2021)
- Administrative staff: 44 (2021)
- Students: 482 (2021)
- Doctoral students: 29 (2021)
- Location: Longyearbyen, Svalbard, Norway
- Tuition Fees: de facto 580 Kroner
- Website: www.unis.no

The University Centre in Svalbard (Norwegian: Universitetssenteret på Svalbard AS; UNIS) is a Norwegian state-owned limited company that is involved in research and provides some higher education in Arctic studies. The company is wholly owned by the Ministry of Education and Research, and the universities of Oslo, Bergen, Tromsø, NTNU and NMBU appoint the board of directors. It is led by a director appointed by the board for a four-year term. The centre is the world’s northernmost research and higher education institution, in Longyearbyen at 78° N latitude. The courses offered fall into five main science disciplines: Arctic biology, Arctic geology, Arctic geophysics, Arctic technology and Arctic safety.

== Organization ==
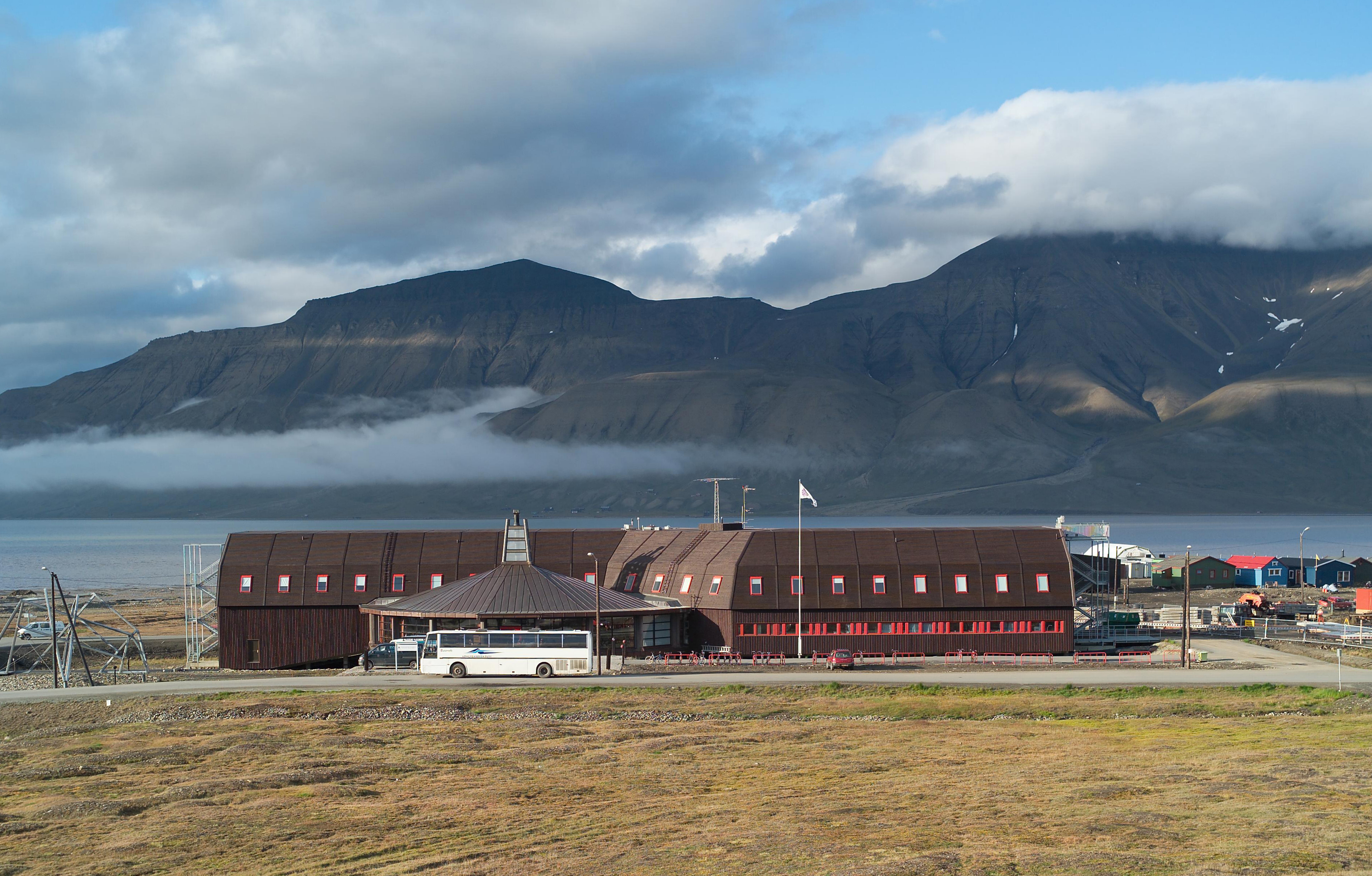
The main building in 2003

The centre was established in 1993 in Longyearbyen, a town of 2,100 inhabitants on the western coast of Spitsbergen island. Despite its name, it is not a university (a status that can only be conferred by the government under certain conditions to larger institutions), but a state-owned enterprise involved in research and some university-level education. The main idea behind establishing UNIS was that the unique geographic location of the island permits the study of Arctic sciences in situ, right outside the company walls. Its official language is Norwegian, but English is used in all tuition and 68% of its 690 students originate from outside Norway (in 2015, foreign students came from 43 countries). The number of students at UNIS was affected by COVID-19 regulations, with 743 students in 2019, 299 students in 2020, and 482 students in 2021, with a corresponding increase of Norwegian students fraction from 32% in 2019 up to 43% in 2020. In 2021 the largest student group came from Norwegian universities (60%), followed by students from Germany (18%) and the Netherlands (10%). The tuition is free of charge and is carried out by 27 full-time professors, 43 adjunct professors, and 160 guest lecturers. The latter are invited from Norwegian and foreign institutions within various joint research projects. Those projects are also instrumental for the enrollment of master and PhD students – UNIS does not accept its own graduates for those courses and requires potential candidates to present a letter of support from their home institution. One important collaboration was an educational exchange program with Russia, though this has been paused since the Russian invasion of Ukraine in 2022. The funding for UNIS is provided by the Norwegian government, research councils, and private industry.

== Campus and events ==
The company conducts both teaching and scientific research. The original UNIS building opened in 1995. The new Svalbard Science Centre, designed by Jarmund/Vigsnæs architects, was officially opened on April 26, 2006, by the King and the Queen of Norway. On September 2, 2009, the Secretary-General of the United Nations, Ban Ki-moon visited UNIS. Together with the Norwegian Minister of Environment Erik Solheim, Ban Ki-moon led a debate on the impact of a melting Arctic on the environment.

The Norwegian Polar Institute, the Svalbard Museum, and the Svalbard Science Forum share the building.

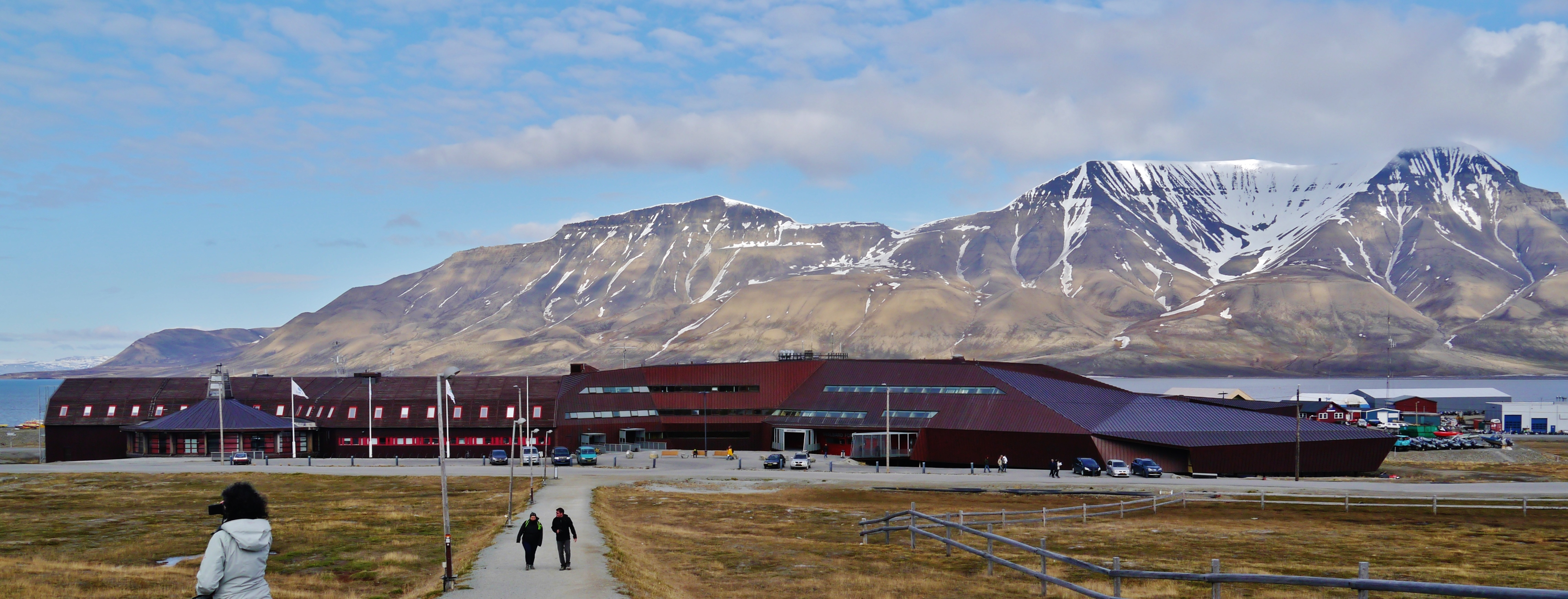
Svalbard Science Centre

== Services ==
Although UNIS has no formal tuition fee, students are required to pay a semester fee of 580 kr (about €65). For overnight scientific cruises, fieldwork, and excursions, students must pay a daily rate of 200 kr for food. UNIS has a library, established in 1993. A significant part of the library is electronic: the company is subscribed to a number of electronic databases that can be accessed from the library computers. UNIS has several research laboratories and a research ship Hanna Resvoll and two Polarcircles UNIS Sila and UNIS Kolga.

Before 2021 most students at UNIS used to live in five renovated mining barracks in Nybyen, a settlement on the southern outskirts of Longyearbyen (30–40 minutes by foot). Since September 2014, some students live in the newly built campus Sjøskrenten, which is a 2-minute walk from UNIS. Both campuses are owned and administered by the Arctic Student Welfare Organization in Tromsø. Nybyen student housing is located in an area with high avalanche risks from the nearby mountain of Gruvefjellet. This led to the construction of a new student housing Elvesletta, completed in the summer of 2021 and located in the city center, which allowed to stop using Nybyen. Elvesletta student housing has a capacity of 300 students and the construction project cost 400 million Norwegian Krones.

== Safety and well-being ==
There is a small hospital and a dentist in Longyearbyen, and a search and rescue team led by the Governor of Svalbard. Any seriously ill person is transported by airplane to mainland Norway. The nearest regional hospital is located in Tromsø, a two-hour flight away.

Polar bears are abundant in the area and are a potential threat to human life. As a result, local citizens often carry rifles, and every UNIS student and member of staff spends their first day learning how to use a rifle to defend themselves against bears.

Because UNIS activities include fieldwork carried out on boats, snowmobiles or on foot in a harsh environment, all new students and staff members are required to present a self-declaration confirming that they are in good health.

== Student life ==
There are various self-organized student groups at UNIS. Many change each semester according to students' areas of interest, whereas some are fixtures. The UNIS student council is elected once per semester and represents the students' interests at university meetings and outside parties. Students are able to rent outdoor equipment, such as skiing or camping gear, from the student equipment group, which is also self-organized by students with an interest in outdoor pursuits. Due to nature being easily accessed in the Arctic, outdoor sports and hiking are popular recreational activities for many students.

== International relations ==
UNIS is an active member of the University of the Arctic. UArctic is an international cooperative network based in the Circumpolar Arctic region, consisting of more than 200 universities, colleges, and other organizations with an interest in promoting education and research in the Arctic region.

UNIS also participates in UArctic's mobility program north2north. The aim of that program is to enable students of member institutions to study in different parts of the North.

== See also ==
- List of northernmost items
