= Longyear River =

River in Svalbard, Norway

Coordinates: 78°11.9′N 15°34.5′E

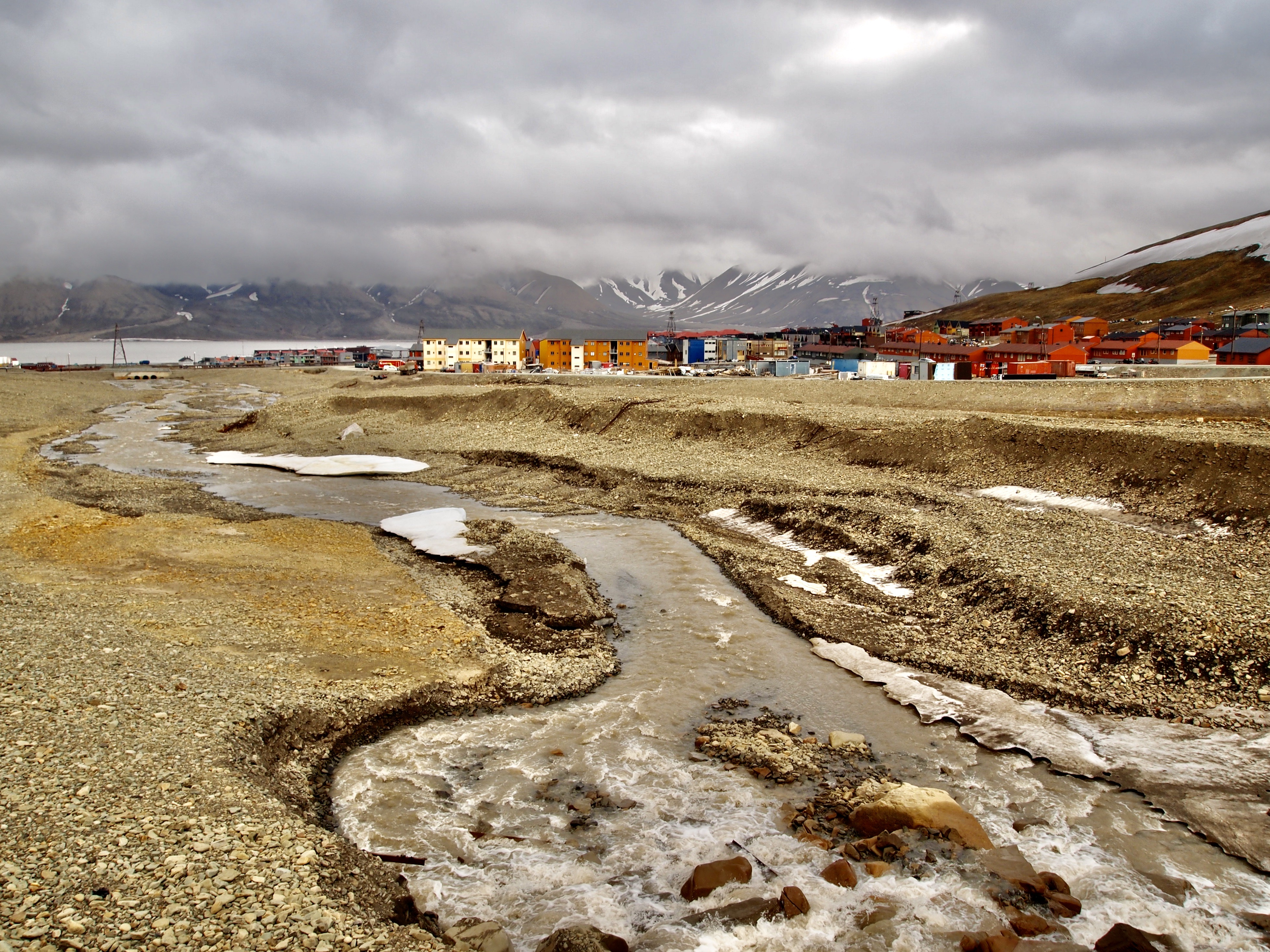
Longyear River, Longyearbyen, Svalbard

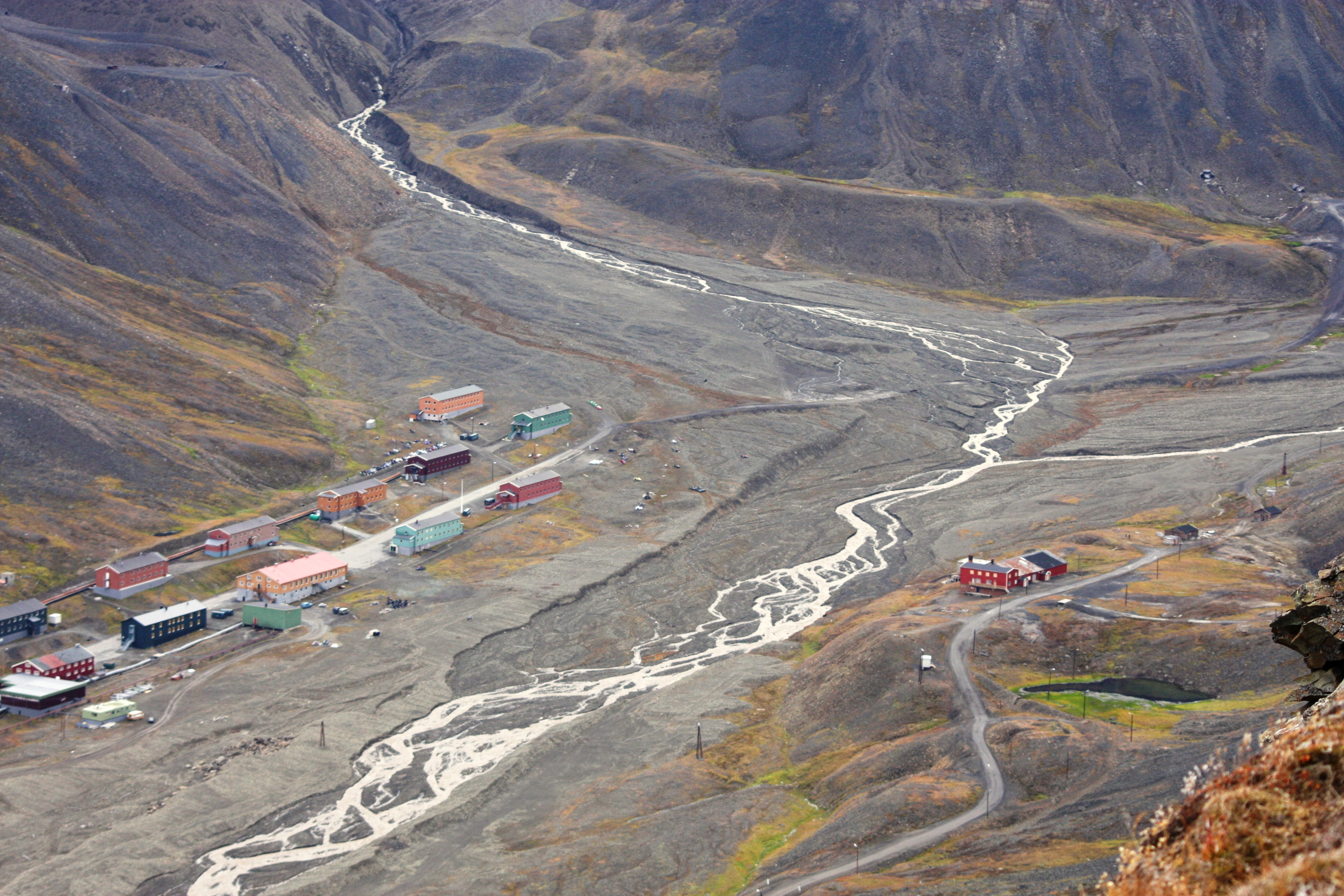
The Longyear River in the upper part of the Longyear Valley, passing Nybyen (left) and Sverdrupbyen

The Longyear River (Norwegian: Longyearelva) is a river which runs through the Longyear Valley, passing through the town of Longyearbyen and draining into Adventfjorden on the island of Spitsbergen in Svalbard, Norway. It is named for the American industrialist John Munro Longyear.
