= John Munro Longyear =

American businessman (1850–1922)

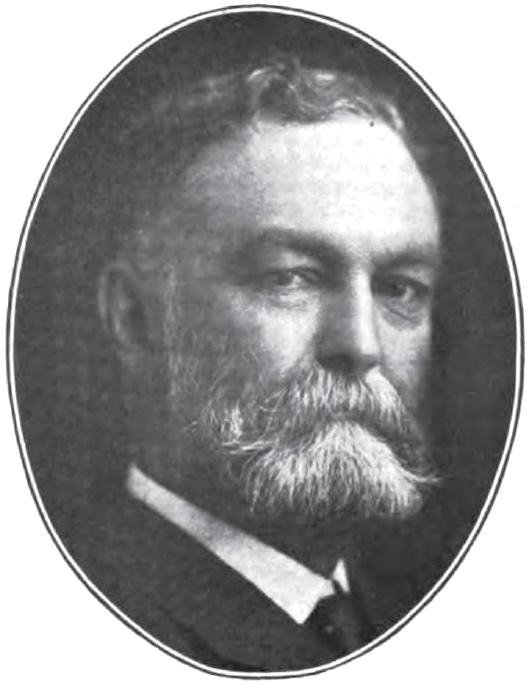
- Born: April 15, 1850; Lansing, Michigan, U.S.
- Died: May 28, 1922 (aged 72); Brookline, Massachusetts, U.S.
- Spouse: Mary Beecher Longyear (m. 1879)
- Children: 7
- Relatives: John W. Longyear (father)

Signature
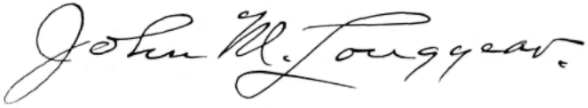

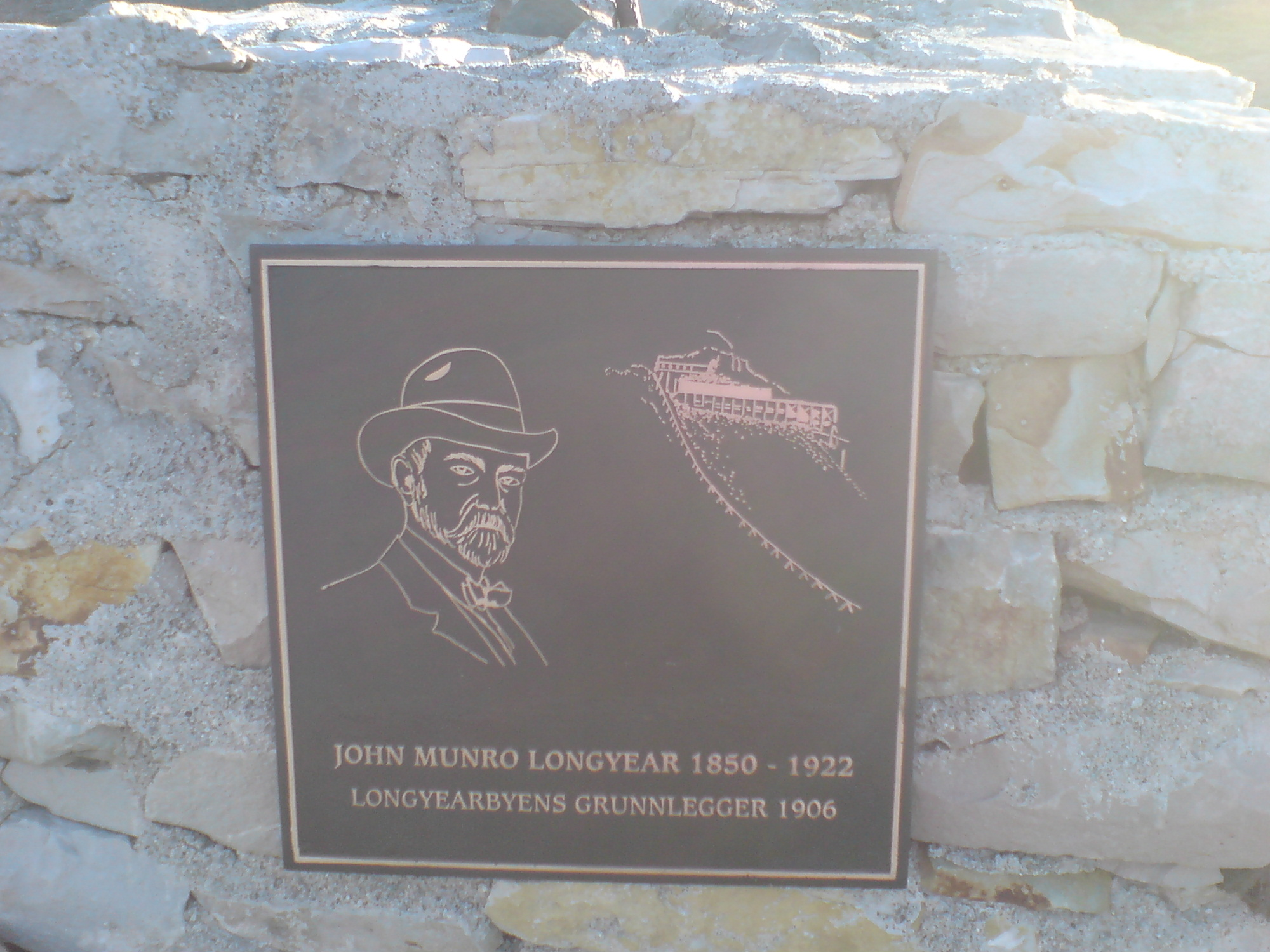
Memorial to John Munro Longyear in Longyearbyen, Norway

John Munro Longyear Sr. (April 15, 1850 – May 28, 1922) was an American businessman and noted developer of timber and mineral lands in the Upper Peninsula of Michigan and Minnesota who became the central figure behind the Arctic Coal Company, which surveyed and mined coalfields on Spitsbergen, from 1905 to 1916. This company developed a settlement on Spitsbergen able to accommodate up to around 500 people which became known as Longyear City, now Longyearbyen, adjacent Advent Bay.

== Biography ==
Longyear was born in Lansing, Michigan, on April 15, 1850, the son of U.S. Congressman John Wesley Longyear (1820–1875) and Harriet Longyear (née Harriet Munro, 1826–1917). He had two brothers, Howard and James, and a sister Ida and possibly other siblings. Through his mother, Longyear was reportedly the great-great-great-grandchild of the Scottish American soldier William Munroe. In young life Longyear suffered various health problems and was prone to exhaustion.

In 1873, when he was 23, Longyear moved to Marquette, Michigan, and for over 20 years established himself as an expert in identifying iron ore properties for mines. One of the mines he was involved with in Iron Mountain, Michigan, became one of the largest underground mines in the United States. He was one of the founders, c. 1890, of the Huron Mountain Club near Big Bay, Michigan, and also served as its first president. In 1906, he founded the Arctic Coal Company with long-time associate Frederick Ayer and several other small shareholders. Longyear was the main owner of the Arctic Coal Company with headquarters in Boston, Massachusetts. Longyear had visited Svalbard in 1901, and bought the Trondhjem Spitsbergen Kulkompani in 1906.

Store Norske Spitsbergen Kulkompani started as a consortium of Norwegian investors in 1916. It purchased Arctic Coal Company's and Ayer and Longyear's lands and operations on Spitsbergen in that year. They went on to develop major coal-mining operations in the Advent Valley region and at Sveagruva, originally a Swedish coal-mining operation.

== Personal life ==
His passport application, dated 1895, describes Longyear, then 45 years old, as 6 feet 0 inches (1.83 m) tall with black and grey hair and brownish grey eyes.

Longyear married Mary Beecher Longyear (née Mary Hawley Beecher, 1851–1931) on January 4, 1879, in Battle Creek, Michigan. Mary was a Christian Scientist and a philanthropist, perhaps best known for her involvement in the publication of the first braille version of the King James Bible. The couple had seven children together: Judith F. Longyear, Robert D. Longyear, Howard M. Longyear, Abby B. Roberts, Helen M. Paul, John B. Longyear, and John M. Longyear Jr. Some sources list the Longyears as having only five children but this discrepancy is likely due to that Howard and John died young, Howard M. Longyear at 20 and John B. Longyear as a toddler. For some years, the family was accompanied by a nurse, a young German woman named Angela Nerling, who both lived and traveled with them.

Longyear constructed a stone mansion on the shores of Lake Superior in the early 1890s. However, in the early 20th century, railroad interests proposed a line running through their property, destroying both the beauty and value of the property. His wife Mary was reportedly unsettled by the idea of leaving the family's home, and so, Longyear arranged for the home to be dismantled and transported 1,300 miles across the country by railroad to Brookline, Massachusetts. The mansion was reassembled there in 1903, and Longyear lived out the rest of his life in Brookline. He died at his home there on May 28, 1922.

== Legacy ==
Places named after Longyear include Longyearbyen, Longyear River, and Longyear Valley in Svalbard; the Longyear Hall of Pedagogy at the Northern Michigan University; the Longyear Building in Marquette, Michigan; and the J. M. Longyear Research Library at the Marquette Regional History Center.

In 2005, Longyear was inducted into the National Mining Hall of Fame.
