= Longyear Valley =

Valley of Spitsbergen, Norway

Coordinates: 78°12.5′N 15°36.4′E

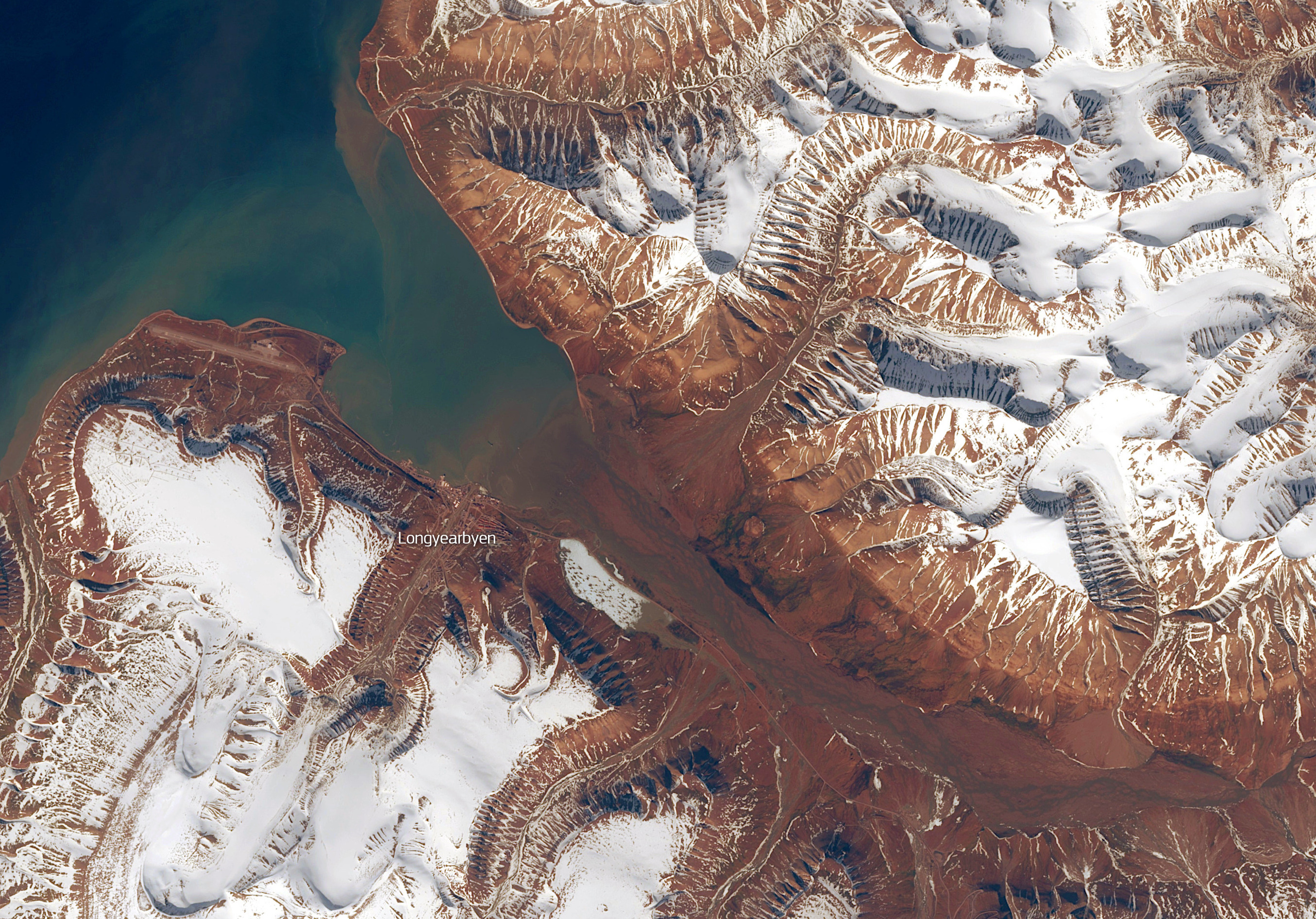
Longyear Valley seen by Sentinel-2

The Longyear Valley (Norwegian: Longyeardalen) is a valley and ravine in Svalbard. It slightly winds 40 kilometres (25 mi) WNW ending in Adventfjorden, facing west, the broadest inlet of Spitsbergen, the main landmass. It has a few wind gaps to the south and north-east over small glaciers, under which small streams form. It is between mountains Platåberget and Gruvefjellet. The town of Longyearbyen is at its foot, which is named for the American industrialist John Munro Longyear. The Longyear River is, like all the island's rivers, silted from surrounding glaciers.
