= John W. Longyear =

American judge and politician (1820–1875)

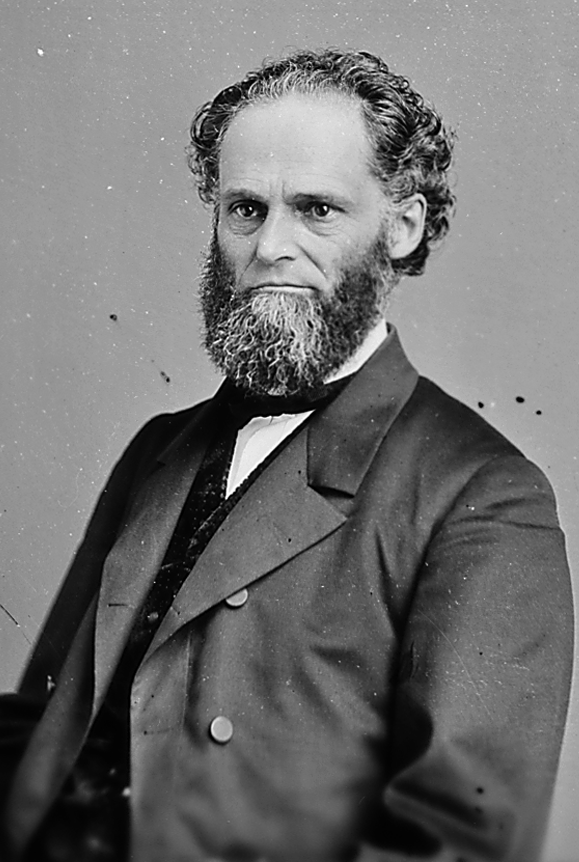
- Mathew Brady photo, National Archives and Records Administration

Judge of the United States District Court for the Eastern District of Michigan
- In office February 18, 1870 – March 10, 1875
- Appointed by: Ulysses S. Grant
- Preceded by: Ross Wilkins
- Succeeded by: Henry Billings Brown

Member of the U.S. House of Representatives from Michigan's 3rd district
- In office March 4, 1863 – March 3, 1867
- Preceded by: Francis William Kellogg
- Succeeded by: Austin Blair

Personal details
- Born: John Wesley Longyear; October 22, 1820 Shandaken, New York, U.S.
- Died: March 10, 1875 (aged 54) Detroit, Michigan, U.S.
- Resting place: Mount Hope Cemetery; Lansing, Michigan, U.S.
- Party: Republican
- Children: John
- Education: read law

John Wesley Longyear (October 22, 1820 – March 10, 1875) was a United States representative from Michigan and a United States district judge of the United States District Court for the Eastern District of Michigan.

== Education and career ==
Longyear was born on October 22, 1820, in Shandaken, New York, the son of Petrus Longyear (also known as Peter Longyear, 1784–1845), of Dutch heritage, and Jerusha Longyear (née Jerusha Stevens), of English heritage. The Longyears were descendants of Jacob Longyear Sr. (also known as Jacob Langjaer), an 18th-century immigrant to New York from Holland. Longyear pursued classical studies at the Lima Academy in New York. He taught school for several years in New York. He moved to Mason, Ingham County, Michigan in 1844 and taught school. He read law and was admitted to the Ingham County bar in 1846. He entered private practice in Mason from 1846 to 1847. He continued private practice in Lansing, Michigan from 1847 to 1870.

== Congressional service ==
Longyear was elected as a Republican from Michigan's 3rd congressional district to the United States House of Representatives of the 38th and 39th United States Congresses, serving from March 4, 1863, to March 3, 1867. He was Chairman of the United States House Committee on Expenditures on Public Buildings for the 38th and 39th United States Congresses. He was not a candidate for renomination in 1866.

=== Other service ===
Longyear was delegate to the Loyalist Convention at Philadelphia, Pennsylvania in 1866 and to the Michigan State constitutional convention in 1867.

== Federal judicial service ==
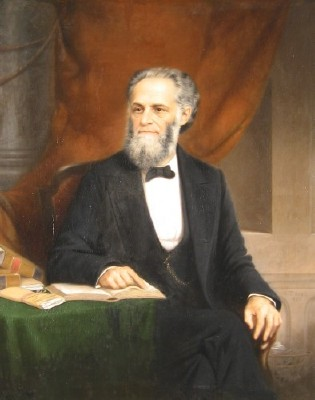
Judicial portrait of Longyear, 1875, by Lewis T. Ives.

Longyear was nominated by President Ulysses S. Grant on February 7, 1870, to a seat on the United States District Court for the Eastern District of Michigan vacated by Judge Ross Wilkins. He was confirmed by the United States Senate on February 18, 1870, and received his commission the same day. His service terminated on March 10, 1875, due to his death in Detroit, where he had moved in 1871. He was interred in Mount Hope Cemetery in Lansing.

== Sources ==
- United States Congress. "John W. Longyear (id: L000434)". Biographical Directory of the United States Congress.
- "Longyear, John Wesley - Federal Judicial Center". www.fjc.gov.
- Works by or about John W. Longyear at the Internet Archive
- The Political Graveyard

U.S. House of Representatives
Preceded by Francis William Kellogg	United States Representative for the 3rd congressional district of Michigan; 1863–1867	Succeeded by Austin Blair
Legal offices
Preceded by Ross Wilkins	Judge of the United States District Court for the Eastern District of Michigan; 1870–1875	Succeeded by Henry Billings Brown
