= Store Norske Spitsbergen Kulkompani =

Norwegian coal mining company

Store Norske Spitsbergen Kulkompani AS
- Type: State owned
- Industry: Mining
- Predecessor: Arctic Coal Company
- Founded: 1916
- Headquarters: Longyearbyen, Svalbard, Norway
- Key people: Per Andersson (CEO)
- Products: Bituminous coal
- Revenue: ▲NOK 1,200 million
- Net income: ▲NOK 350 million (2009)
- Owner: Norwegian Ministry of Trade and Industry
- Number of employees: 340 (2010)
- Website: www.snsk.no

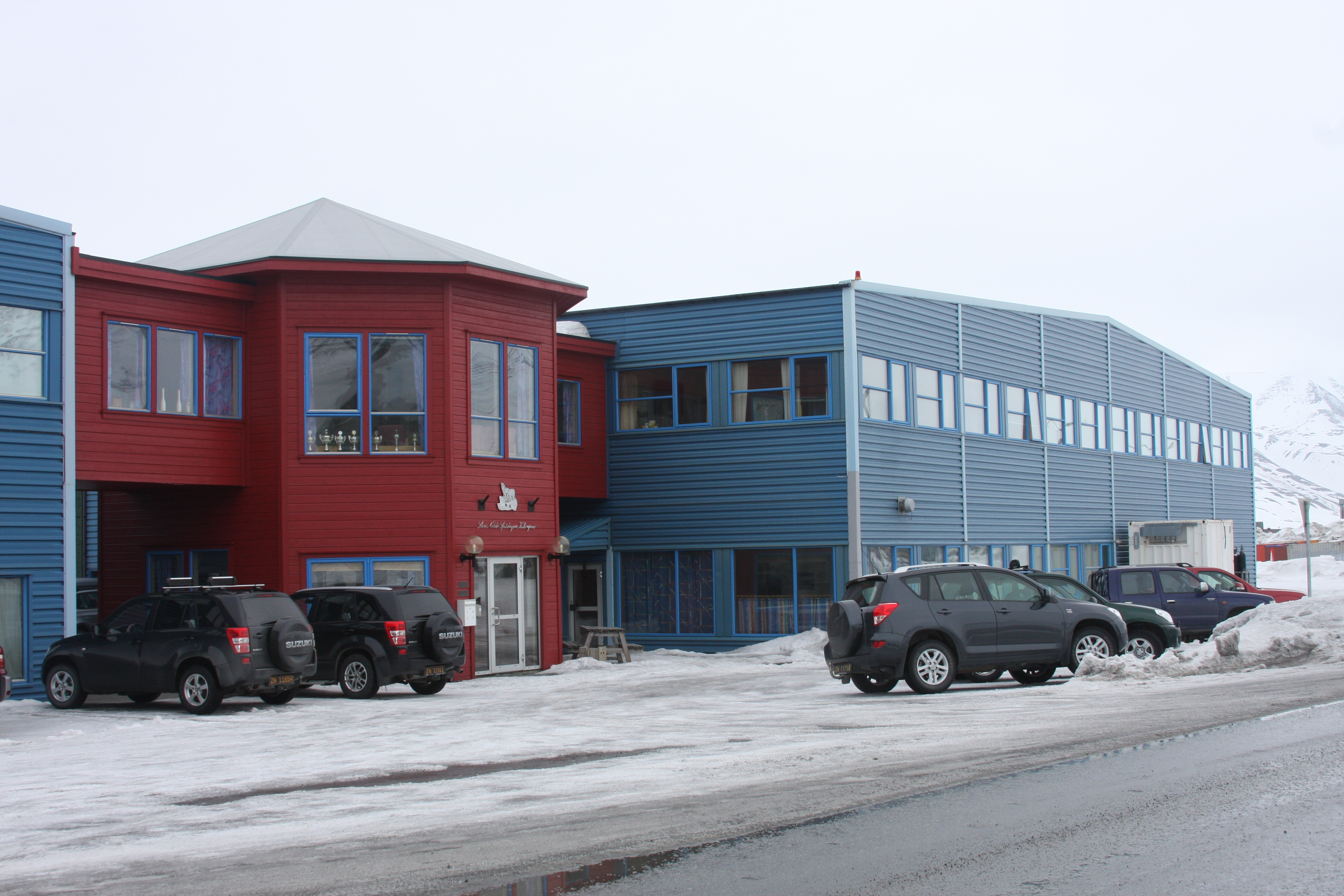
The headquarters in central Longyearbyen

Store Norske Spitsbergen Kulkompani (SNSK), or simply Store Norske, is a Norwegian coal mining company based on the Svalbard archipelago. It was formed in 1916, after a Norwegian purchase of the American Arctic Coal Company (ACC).

The company had 360 employees and operated two coal mines. The larger one was located in the Sveagruva settlement, about 60 km south of Longyearbyen. The Svea Nord longwall mine had an annual output of 2 million tonnes of bituminous coal. A third of it was sold for metallurgical purposes. The managing director of Store Norske Spitsbergen Kulkompani was Per Andersson. The Sveagruva mine closed in 2017.

The Store Norske Spitsbergen Kulkompani had a shipping port at Cape Amsterdam, 15 km from Sveagruva.

In 2021, the Store Norske Spitsbergen Kulkompani was ranked no. 81 in the Arctic Environmental Responsibility Index (AERI) that covers 120 oil, gas, and mining companies involved in resource extraction north of the Arctic Circle.

In 2025, with the closure of Mine 7, SNSK ceased coal mining in Svalbard.

== History ==
Store Norske Spitsbergen Kulkompani was founded in 1916. The Norwegian state, that had owned 99.9 per cent of the shares in the company from 1975, increased its shareholding to 100 per cent in 2015.

== Former chief executive officers ==
- Hilmar Reksten
- Einar Sverdrup
- Robert Hermansen
