= Leif J. Sverdrup =

United States Army general

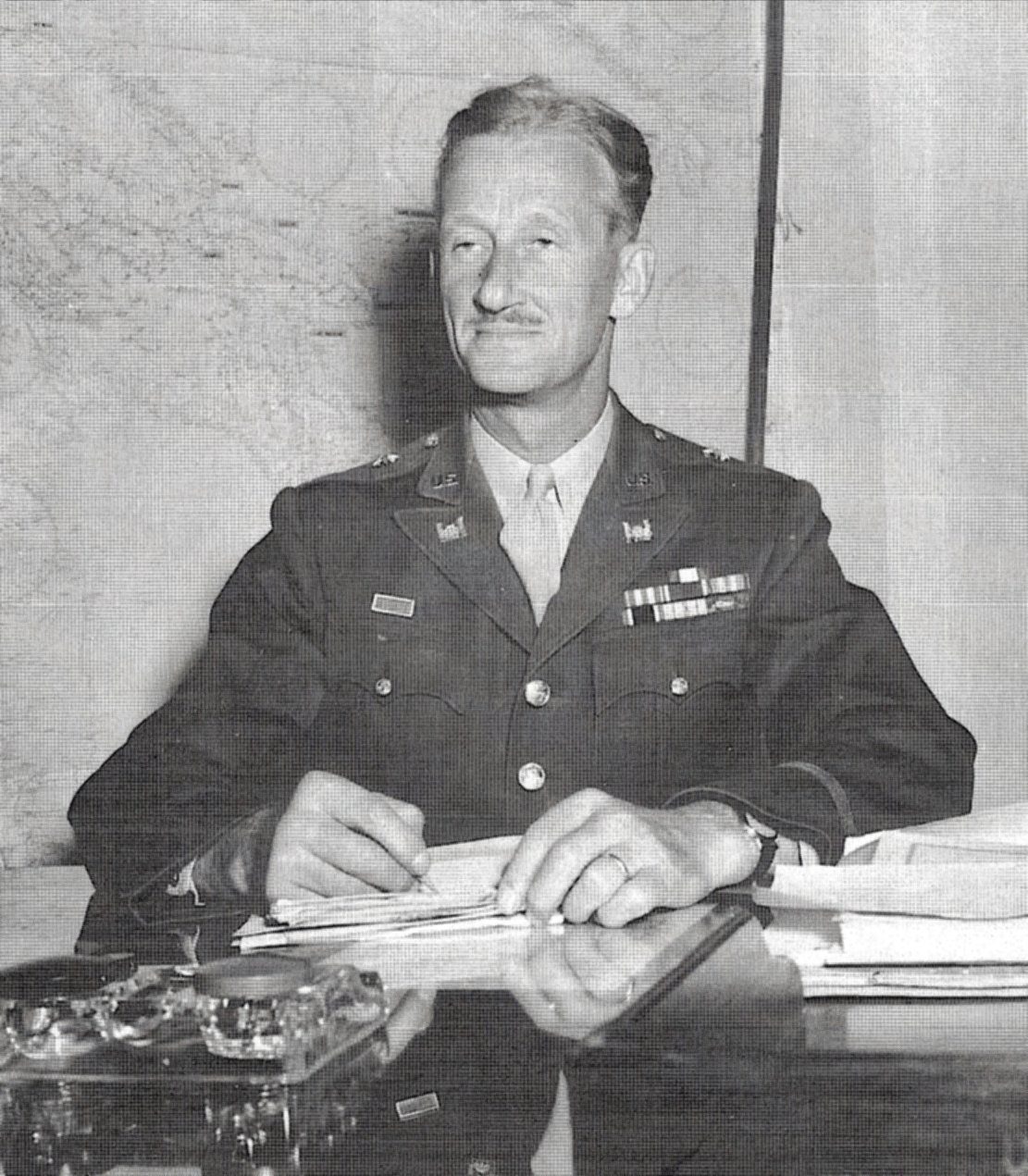
- Sverdrup in 1944
- Born: Leif Johan Sverdrup; 11 January 1898; Ytre Sula, Sulen Municipality, Norway
- Died: 2 January 1976 (aged 77); St. Louis, Missouri, U.S.
- Burial place: Valhalla Cemetery, St Louis, Missouri
- Military career
- Allegiance: United States of America
- Branch: United States Army
- Service years: 1918–1919; 1942–1958
- Rank: Major General
- Nickname: Jack
- Service number: O-129029
- Commands: 102nd Infantry Division
- Conflicts: World War I World War II: Kokoda Track campaign; Battle of Buna-Gona; New Guinea campaign; Philippines Campaign (1944–45)
- Awards: Distinguished Service Cross; Distinguished Service Medal; Silver Star; Legion of Merit; Purple Heart; Commander of the Order of the British Empire (Australia)
- Other work: Sverdrup & Parcel

Leif Johan Sverdrup CBE (11 January 1898 – 2 January 1976) was a Norwegian-born American civil engineer and general with the U.S. Army Corps of Engineers in the first half of the 20th century. He is best known for his service in the Southwest Pacific Area during World War II where he was Chief Engineer under General of the Army Douglas MacArthur.

The son of a distinguished Norwegian family, Sverdrup emigrated to the United States in 1914. After serving with the US Army in World War I, he earned a degree in civil engineering at the University of Minnesota in 1921. He worked for a time for the Missouri State Highway Department before founding Sverdrup & Parcel, a civil engineering firm specializing in bridge construction, with John Ira Parcel, his former University of Minnesota engineering professor. His firm was involved in the construction of a number of important bridges, including the Washington Bridge and Amelia Earhart Bridge over the Missouri River and the Hurricane Deck Bridge over the Lake of the Ozarks.

In 1941, Sverdrup became involved with the construction of a chain of airstrips across the Pacific Ocean to enable heavy bombers to be delivered to the Philippines. He was re-commissioned in the US Army as a colonel in 1942 and became Chief of the Construction Section in General MacArthur's Southwest Pacific Area. In 1942 he made three treks across the Owen Stanley Range in Papua and New Guinea on engineer reconnaissance missions into enemy-occupied territory, for which he was decorated with the Silver Star and the Distinguished Service Medal. In 1944 he became the theater's Chief Engineer.

After the war, he commanded the 102nd Infantry Division of the US Army Reserve from 1947 to 1958. Sverdrup & Parcel went on to design and oversee the construction of many major projects, including the Arnold Engineering Development Center and the Chesapeake Bay Bridge-Tunnel, the latter being named one of the Seven Engineering Wonders of the Modern World after its completion in 1964.

== Early life ==
Leif Johan Sverdrup was born on the island of Ytre Sula in Sulen Municipality, Norway. He was born on 11 January 1898, the son of Edvard Sverdrup, a high school teacher and Lutheran minister, and his second wife Agnes née Vollan. The family was a distinguished one in Norway: Leif was the great-nephew of Johan Sverdrup, the former Prime Minister of Norway; the grandson of Harald Ulrik Sverdrup, the politician; the cousin of Otto Sverdrup, the Arctic explorer; the half-brother of the oceanographer and meteorologist Harald Sverdrup (of who the unit is named after); and the brother of the mining engineer and businessman Einar Sverdrup and women's rights activist Mimi Sverdrup Lunden.

Leif was educated at Nordstrand Middle School and Aars and Voss School in Oslo. Following a quarrel with his father, Leif left Norway for America to stay with his relatives in Minnesota, the family of his cousin George Sverdrup, the son of the theologian Georg Sverdrup, who had settled in Minneapolis in 1874. After arriving in New York City on 7 December 1914, he entered Augsburg College, Minneapolis, in September 1916, and graduated with his Bachelor of Arts degree in May 1918.

== World War I ==
Sverdrup enlisted in the US Army at Fort Snelling, Minnesota on 26 July 1918. He was posted to Camp Devens, Massachusetts for training with the 36th Division. While there he took advantage of a regulation waiving the normal five-year residency requirement for members of the armed services seeking to take out US citizenship. Sverdrup formally took the oath as a citizen in Boston on 30 September 1918. The US Army then sent him to the Field Artillery's Officer Training Center at Camp Zachary Taylor, near Louisville, Kentucky, where he was commissioned as a second lieutenant on 18 January 1919. The war having ended, Sverdrup was immediately placed in the inactive reserves. He was honorably discharged after nominally serving two five-year terms on 17 January 1929.

== Between the wars ==
Sverdrup decided to become an engineer and enrolled in a civil engineering course at the University of Minnesota in 1919. During the 1921 Spring break he returned to Norway, where he was reconciled with his father, accompanying his parents on a short holiday in Germany. He graduated with his Bachelor of Science in Civil Engineering degree in June 1921. While at the University of Minnesota he met Helen Laura (Molly) Egilsrud, a recent immigrant from Norway like himself. She agreed to marry him, but only after she had graduated, worked for a year, and taken a trip to Europe. They were finally married on 26 November 1924. Their union produced two sons, Johan Norman (Jack) Sverdrup, born in 1926, and Ralph Lee Sverdrup, born in 1928, who died of encephalitis in 1932. In the meantime, Sverdrup took a job with the Missouri State Highway Department. His first major project involved supervising the construction of a bridge for U.S. Route 50 in Missouri over the Gasconade River. Around this time, frustrated by Americans who pronounced his name "leaf" instead of "life", he started calling himself "Jack".

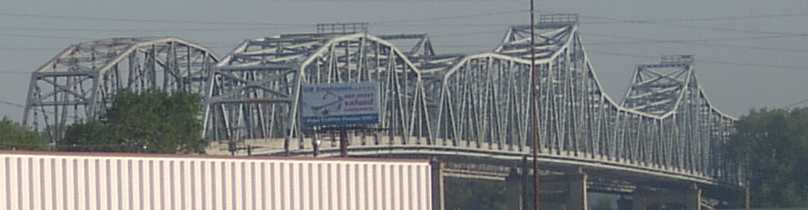
Platte Purchase and Fairfax Bridges, seen from the south bank.

In 1928, Sverdrup joined with his former University of Minnesota engineering professor John Ira Parcel in the formation of Sverdrup & Parcel, a civil engineering firm with a speciality field of bridges. Parcel had tenure at Minnesota for a long time and was reluctant to sever his ties completely, but eventually, he decided to join the new company, taking an unpaid Sabbatical from the university for one year. Sverdrup owned 60% and Parcel 40% of the new firm, which opened its doors on 1 April 1928. The company's headquarters was located in St. Louis, Missouri. Sverdrup & Parcel's first contract was for the design of a bridge over the Missouri River at Hermann, Missouri, for which it received a fee of $33,000. While at the Missouri State Highway Department Sverdrup met D. C. Wolfe and E. R. Grant, and he asked them if they would join the company. Sverdrup subsequently borrowed design engineer Brice R. Smith from Missouri's leading supplier of bridge components, Stupp Bros. Bridge & Iron Co. By 1936, all three would become partners in the firm.

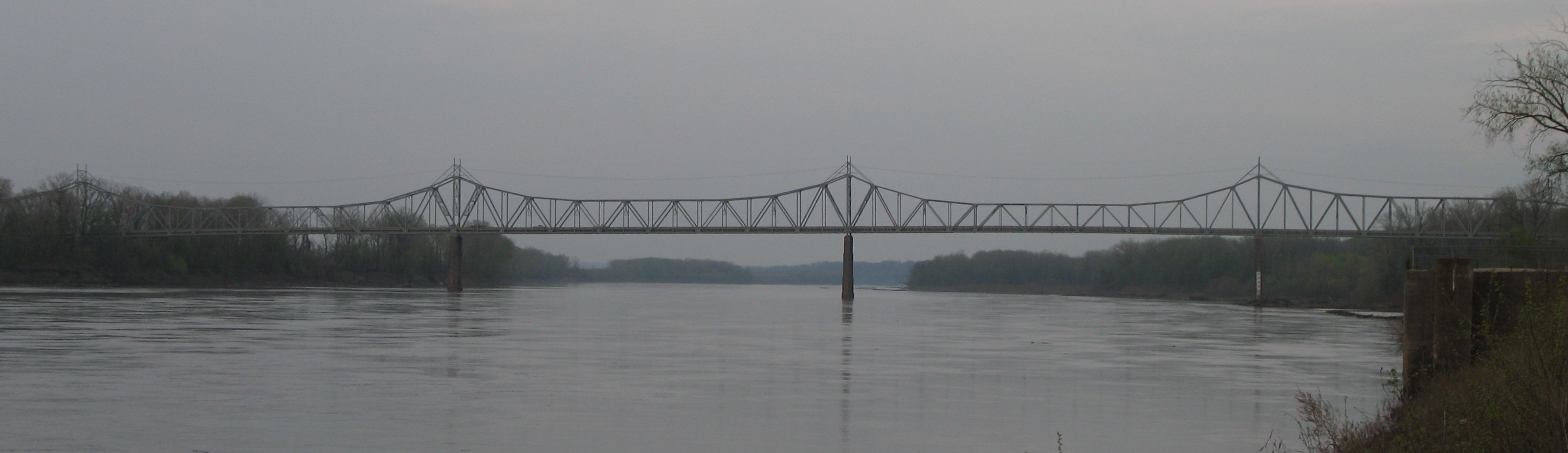
Washington Bridge from the southwest bank.

Initially the young firm struggled, with no contracts for major jobs lined up after the Hermann bridge, and by early 1929 it faced insolvency. However neither Sverdrup nor Parcel wished to let well-trained employees go, something which became an informal company policy over the years. A $17,000 fee for the design and supervision of the construction of the 7th Street Trafficway Bridge in Kansas City, Kansas, and then a $32,000 one for the Fairfax Bridge over the Missouri River helped Sverdrup & Parcel weather the worst of the Great Depression. The subsequent New Deal involved a major program of public works. Sverdrup & Parcel applied to the Public Works Administration for the design commissions for the Washington Bridge over the Missouri River at Washington, Missouri and the Hurricane Deck Bridge over the Lake of the Ozarks in Camden County, Missouri. Sverdrup & Parcel was awarded both contracts, valued at $42,000 and $43,000 respectively. During 1934, it was awarded the contract for what is now known as the Amelia Earhart Bridge over the Missouri River between Atchison, Kansas and Buchanan County, Missouri. Sverdrup & Parcel was now becoming involved in projects further afield. A project to generate electricity from tidal power at Passamaquoddy Bay brought Sverdrup into contact with Captain Hugh J. (Pat) Casey of the US Army Corps of Engineers, the chief engineer on the project. The project folded when federal funding was withdrawn in 1936, but Sverdrup and Casey became friends. In 1940, Sverdrup was appointed to the board of inquiry that investigated the collapse of the Tacoma Narrows Bridge.

== World War II ==
=== Airbase construction ===
In October 1941, the War Department ordered work to commence on a chain of airstrips to enable heavy bombers to be flown from the United States to the Philippines. The existing route, via Midway Atoll, Wake Island and Guam was considered too vulnerable to disruption by Japanese forces located on nearby islands. A more secure route via Christmas Island, Canton Island, Fiji, Noumea, Rockhampton, Darwin and Fort Stotsenburg was urgently required. An initial sum of $5 million was allotted to construct three 7,000-foot (2,100 m) runways at each site, along with appropriate fuel and maintenance buildings. The project was given the highest possible priority rating. On 16 November, Sverdrup arrived in Honolulu, Hawaii and signed a cost-plus-fixed-fee contract for architectural and engineering services in connection with the construction of the airstrips on the route that lay in British, French and Australian territory. The contract was soon expanded to include the supervision of the construction.

Sverdrup flew to Fiji, and was able to report that work had started at Nadi, Fiji on 21 November. When he discussed progress on Nandi Airport in Fiji which New Zealand had agreed to extend, Walter Nash, then New Zealand Minister of Finance, recalled Sverdrup saying when he was leaving that there was no formal agreement for payment by America. So on the back of one of his business cards Sverdrup drew a cross representing the airfield, wrote "£250,000" and initialled it "L.J.S." The extension was actually estimated to cost £750,000.

On Noumea he found that hills obstructed the approaches to Tontouta. Accordingly, he arranged for the Australian workmen there to complete it as an emergency field only and for development of the major airbase to be carried out at Plaine Des Gaiacs Airfield. Sverdrup was working in Suva when he heard the news of the Japanese attack on Pearl Harbor.

The Pan American Airways facility for its Clippers at Noumea had included the yacht Southern Seas, formerly owned by Cyrus H.K. Curtis as Lyndonia, converted to a floating luxury hotel ship. With the start of the Pacific war Pan American abandoned its commercial facilities in the war zone and requested they be taken over by the U.S. military. Southern Seas, along with other company property, was taken over by the U.S. Army and Sverdrup recommended the ship be operated to support the airbase construction in the islands, including doing required survey work. On 30 December 1941 the Southern Seas was purchased from Pan American Airways by the U.S. Army Hawaii District Engineer for the sum of one dollar while settlement was reached on value of the ship.

Captain Norman Miller in I Took The Sky Road describes a meeting with Sverdrup during a stop in Nouméa harbor on the return flight of XPBS-1 from Java where the seaplane had delivered high priority supplies including torpedo exploders:

The luxury of the Southern Seas was a far cry from the cramped quarters of the old XPBS, and I remained aboard over night, reveling in comforts previously enjoyed by Pan Am's customers. But the yacht was of no further use to Pan Am. Their service to New Zealand had been discontinued. The yacht was to be turned over to Sverdrup to serve him as a floating office which could follow him around among the islands.

They decided Sverdrup would fly with Miller in XPBS-1 from Nouméa to Suva, Fiji, Sverdrup's headquarters, with the Southern Seas following. He arrived in Sydney on 30 December. In January 1942 Sverdrup signed a cost-plus-fixed-fee contract to provide architectural and engineering services to US Army Forces in Australia (USAFIA). The contract remained in force until 15 May, when it was terminated by mutual agreement and Sverdrup & Parcel employees in Australia became civilian employees of the US Army. On 16 April, Sverdrup boarded the first of a series of aircraft which would return him to the United States.

=== New Guinea Campaign ===
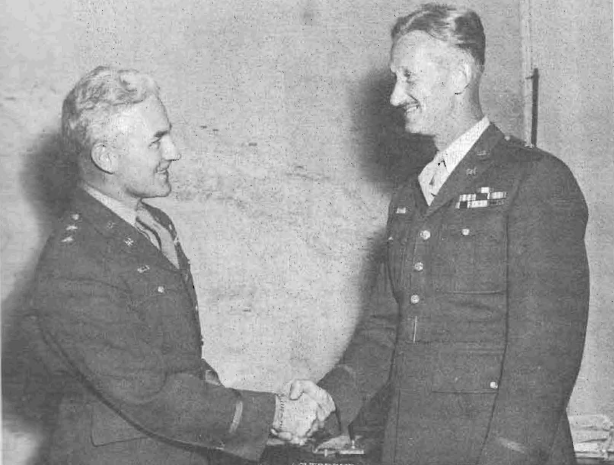
Brigadier General Leif Sverdrup (right) and Major General Hugh Casey (left) in 1944.

In Australia, meanwhile, Brigadier General Hugh "Pat" Casey, now the Chief Engineer at General Douglas MacArthur's General Headquarters (GHQ) Southwest Pacific Area (SWPA), obtained MacArthur's permission to appoint Sverdrup as the chief of his Construction Section, with the rank of colonel. On 8 May 1942, in Washington, DC, Sverdrup was directly commissioned as a colonel in the US Army. He was soon on his way back to Australia. Initially, the construction effort focused on bases in northern Australia but after the Battle of the Coral Sea, MacArthur was convinced that the Japanese would make another attempt to capture Port Moresby and ordered improvements to the airfields there and the construction of new bases at Merauke and Milne Bay in order to cover the approaches to Port Moresby. The July 1942 decision to attack the Japanese base at Rabaul altered priorities and added a requirement for the development of bases on the northern coast of Papua around Buna. The commander of Allied Air Forces, Lieutenant General George Brett called for 12 additional airstrips: four each at Port Moresby, Milne Bay and Buna. Sverdrup estimated that this would take a year, and suggested that either Brett lower his requirements or Casey obtain more engineer units. Casey ordered every available engineer unit to Papua and attempted to reduce the workload by cutting back on airbase facilities, shortening runways from 6,000 feet (1,800 m) to 4,000 feet (1,200 m), and substituting Marsden mat for pavement.

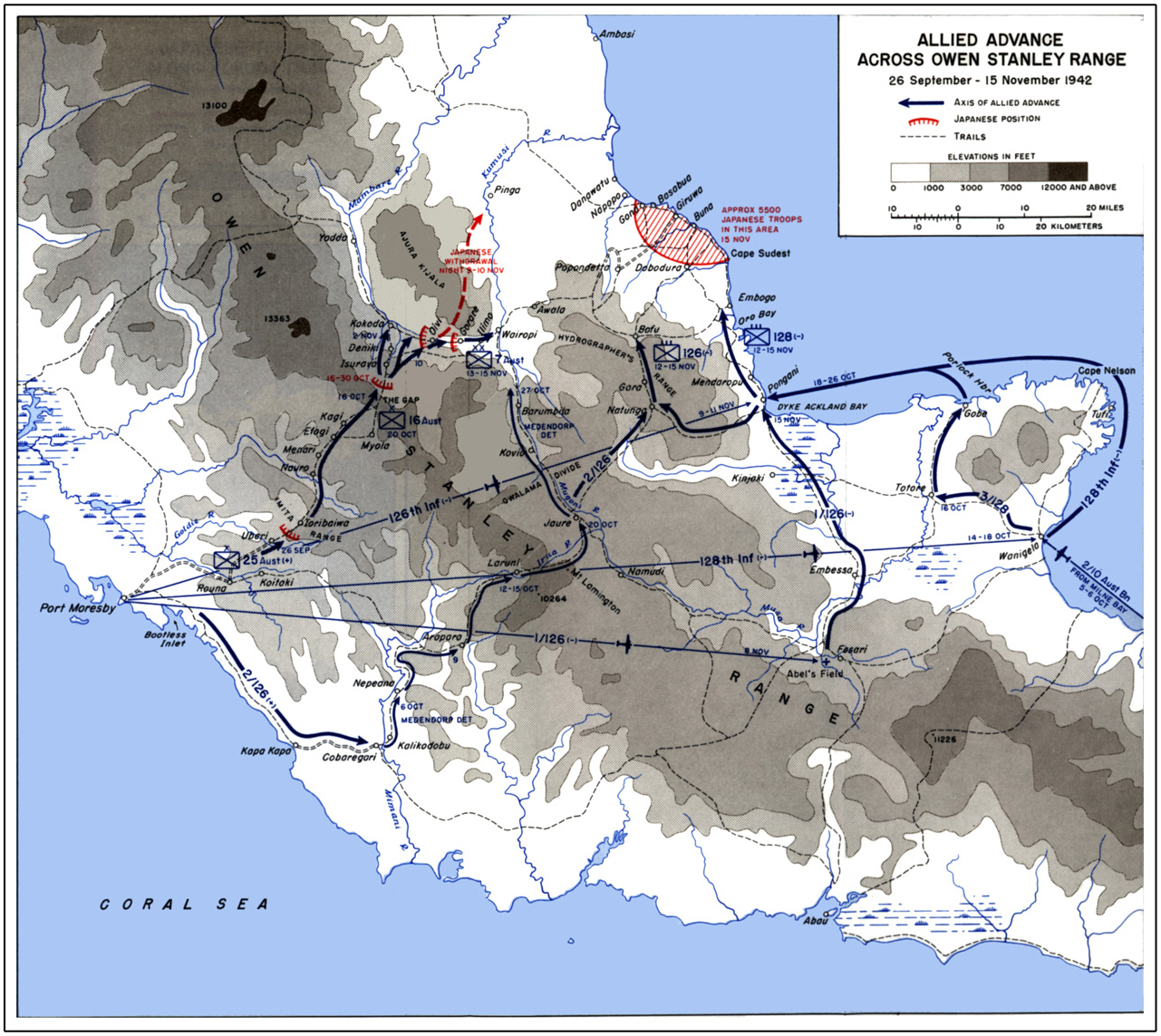
Allied advance across Owen Stanley Range 26 September - 15 November 1942.

In September 1942, MacArthur decided to outflank Japanese troops on the Kokoda Trail by sending an American regimental combat team over the Owen Stanley Range. Two alternate means of crossing the mountains seemed possible. One, the Kapa Kapa Trail was known to climb to elevations above 9,000 feet (2,700 m) and present formidable obstacles. The other, known as the Abau Trail held the possibility. Casey and Sverdrup took charge of investigating the Abau Trail. They reached Abau on 18 September. Casey explored the harbor, taking depth soundings from a native canoe. Sverdrup set out for Jaure with a party of one American, two Australians from the Australian New Guinea Administrative Unit, ten native police from the Royal Papuan Constabulary and 26 native carriers. After eight days on the trail, scaling heights of 5,000 feet (1,500 m), Sverdrup concluded that it would not be practical for troops to traverse the route and turned back, reaching Abau on 3 October. Meanwhile, Casey had concluded that the harbor was too shallow even for lighters. However, the trip was not a total loss, for Sverdrup had sighted a plateau north of the Owen Stanley Range that he believed could be suitable for airstrips, allowing troops to be flown across the Owen Stanley Range. His opinion was supported by Cecil Abel, a missionary who knew the area well, who recommended establishing an airstrip at Fasari in the Musa River valley. Abel was flown to Fasari to make a start on an airstrip on 11 October, while Sverdrup set out from Abau with 190 men, including Flight Lieutenant M. J. Leahy, an expert on Papua, who knew many of the tribal chiefs personally. They reached Fasari on 18 October. Abel had cleared the site by burning and all that remained was some stumping and grubbing. A DC-3 was able to land the next day on the strip, which became known as Abel's Landing. Sverdrup and Leahy set out on 20 October to explore further north and found another suitable airstrip site near the village of Embessa and Kinjaki, which Sverdrup had cleared. A message dropped by air instructed him to go to Pongani, where he found troops of Company C, 114th Engineer Battalion that had flown to Wanigela airstrip and had made their way to Pongani by travelling along the coast by boat. Sverdrup supervised the construction of Pongani airstrip. All three airstrips were soon in use. In December 1942, Sverdrup made a third trip, from the Australian base at Bena Bena through the Markham Valley to the vicinity of the Japanese base at Lae. On each expedition he submitted detailed reports on the possibility of construction in the area. Sverdrup was awarded the Silver Star. His citation read:

For gallantry in action near Abau, New Guinea from 18 September 1942 to 6 October 1942. Colonel Sverdrup led reconnaissance party into enemy-occupied territory, far in advance of friendly troops, and thereby secured information of great value to the command.

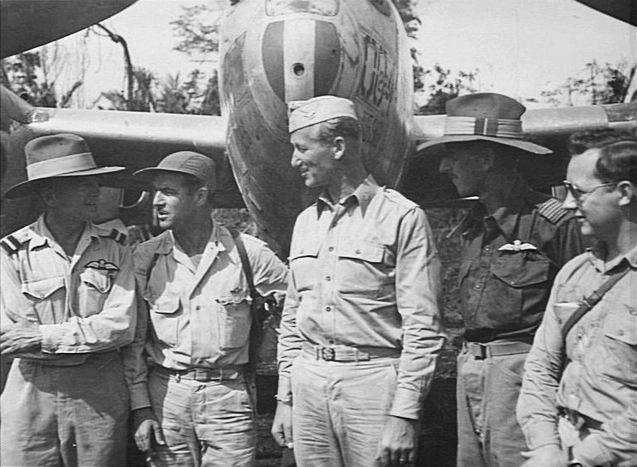
Brigadier General Paul Wurtsmith (second from left), Commanding General, V Fighter Command, the pilot of first allied combat plane to land at Tadji; Sverdrup (center); and Colonel Robert Morrissey (right), Chief of Staff, V Fighter Command, the pilot of second lightning to land, are greeted by Air Commodore F. R. W. Scherger (left) and Wing Commander W. A. C. Dale (second from right), whose engineers of No. 62 Works Wing RAAF built the airstrip. General Wurtsmith's plane is in background.

Sverdrup was subsequently awarded the Distinguished Service Medal. His citation read:

For exceptionally meritorious service to the Government in a position of great responsibility in Papua, New Guinea, during the period 23 July 1942 to 23 January 1943. During the Papuan campaign, Colonel Sverdrup personally executed numerous reconnaissance missions in New Guinea, over difficult mountains and through swamp and jungle, far forward of the areas occupied by our troops, in order to secure vital information needed for engineering operations. Utilizing native labor, which he recruited and trained, equipped only with hand tools, he constructed with great rapidity a series of air fields urgently needed for the transport by air of troops and supplies to distant and otherwise inaccessible areas. His success in completion of these essential advance airfields, accomplished under severe physical hardship and at great personal risk, made possible the effective coordination of land and air forces and contributed materially to the success of the Papuan campaign.

=== Philippines Campaign ===
Sverdrup was promoted to brigadier general in May 1944. In July, Casey was appointed to head the Army Service Command (ASCOM), a special force designed to provide logistical support, establish bases, and run them until the US Army Services of Supply (USASOS) was ready to take over. Sverdrup became acting Chief Engineer, GHQ SWPA in Casey's absence. On 12 January 1945, MacArthur personally decorated Sverdrup with the Distinguished Service Cross. His citation read:

For extraordinary heroism in action against the enemy at Lingayen, Luzon, Philippine Islands, on 9 January 1945. Landing with the first wave of assault troops and with complete disregard for his own safety, he proceeded immediately to render invaluable assistance in the seizure of the vital Lingayen airfield. General Sverdrup's exceptional courage, initiative determination contributed immeasurably to the success accomplishment of the mission.

Sverdrup became the first American to be decorated for the Luzon campaign. MacArthur, in making the presentation, said: "This is the engineer soldier at his best."Franzwa & Ely 1980, p. 210 Sverdrup was promoted to major general in March 1945. On 6 March 1945, the Engineer Construction Command (ENCOM) was formed under USASOS to handle all military and civilian construction in the Philippines and Sverdrup was appointed to command it. Later in 1945 MacArthur made a more personal gesture. He presented Sverdrup with his personal Gold Castles insignia, a gift from his father, Arthur MacArthur, Jr., on his graduation from the U.S. Military Academy. MacArthur had not worn them since he had transferred to the infantry. He told Sverdrup that "they deserved to be worn by a real engineer" and made him promise that they would not end up in a museum.

=== Occupation of Japan ===
In August 1945, Sverdrup flew home on MacArthur's private aircraft, the Bataan, accompanying Lieutenant General Richard K. Sutherland to Washington, DC for a series of meetings at The Pentagon before going on leave. The Surrender of Japan caused Sverdrup to cut short his leave and return to GHQ in Manila. On 29 August 1945, Sverdrup landed in Japan. He entered Tokyo the next day with Casey to find a site for GHQ, which they decided to locate in the Imperial Hotel, Tokyo. On 2 September, Sverdrup attended the formal surrender aboard the USS Missouri. He received the Legion of Merit on 21 September before departing for home again the next day.

== Post-war ==
On 3 June 1947, the 102nd Infantry Division was activated as part of the Organized Reserve, with Sverdrup in command. Sverdrup retired from the Army on 31 January 1958, at the age of 60. He attended annual reunions of MacArthur's key officers, held on MacArthur's birthday, starting in 1949. That year Sverdrup was presented with his Commander of the Order of the British Empire by the Australian Ambassador to the United States, Norman Makin, in a ceremony at the Embassy of Australia in Washington, D.C. When Sverdrup heard that MacArthur was returning from Japan after being relieved by President Harry S. Truman in April 1951, Sverdrup flew to greet him on arrival, along with Hanford MacNider and William C. Chase. On 2 May 1975, Sverdrup attended the Engineer Dinner at Fort Belvoir, Virginia which marked the US Army Corps of Engineers' 200th anniversary and presented MacArthur's Gold Castles insignia to the Chief of Engineers, Lieutenant General William C. Gribble, Jr.

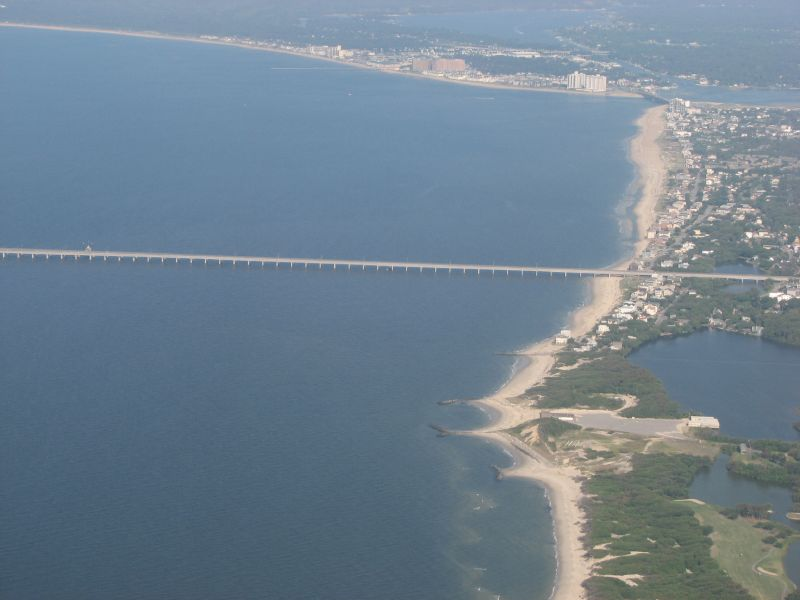
Aerial view of the Virginia Beach, Virginia entrance to the Chesapeake Bay Bridge-Tunnel

Sverdrup returned to Sverdrup & Parcel, but with much less personal involvement than before, as Grant was now running the company, which was incorporated in 1946. That year it was awarded the contract for a complex of wind tunnels at the Arnold Engineering Development Center, with a fee in excess of $1 million. Sverdrup & Parcel continued, becoming Sverdrup Civil, and more recently Jacobs Sverdrup, a portion of one of the world's largest civil engineering groups. In the 1960s, Sverdrup Civil oversaw the successful design and construction of the additional "parallel trestles" of the Chesapeake Bay Bridge-Tunnel (CBBT), doubling the non-tunnel sections, adding the capacity of two more lanes and adding emergency turnouts to the bridge-tunnel facility. The CBBT was still the longest in the world 30 years after Leif Sverdrup and his company completed the original project. However the company image was tarnished in August 2005 by the effect of Hurricane Katrina on the Louisiana Superdome, which Sverdrup & Parcel had been involved in designing, and the collapse of Sverdrup & Parcel's I-35W Mississippi River bridge across the Mississippi River at Minneapolis, Minnesota, on 1 August 2007.

== Legacy ==
Leif J. Sverdrup died on 2 January 1976 and was interred in Valhalla Cemetery in Hanley Hills, a suburb of St Louis, with full military honors. A number of professional organizations also began annual award programs in his honor and memory. The John I. Parcel – Leif J. Sverdrup Civil Engineering Management Award is awarded annually by the American Society of Civil Engineers. In 1976, he was elevated to National Honor Member by Chi Epsilon national civil engineering honor society. Since 1980, the Sverdrup Medal of the Society of American Military Engineers has been awarded annually in his memory. At Augsburg College, the annual Sverdrup Visiting Scientist Program is endowed by the Sverdrup family and by NASA through the Minnesota Space Grant Consortium. In 1964, Sverdrup received the Golden Plate Award of the American Academy of Achievement. The communications building at Webster University's main campus is named after Sverdrup. The building houses the School of Communications, as well as the May Gallery of art. Camp Sakima at the S-F Scout Ranch is also named for Sverdrup. The Sverdrup United States Army Reserve Center in North County St. Louis was dedicated in his honor upon completion in the 1970s and houses several of his military awards and a plaque at its entrance. The Sverdrup chapter of the Army Engineer Association at Fort Leonard Wood, Missouri, is named for him as well having the front gate bear his name.
