= Sverdrup & Parcel =

American civil engineering company

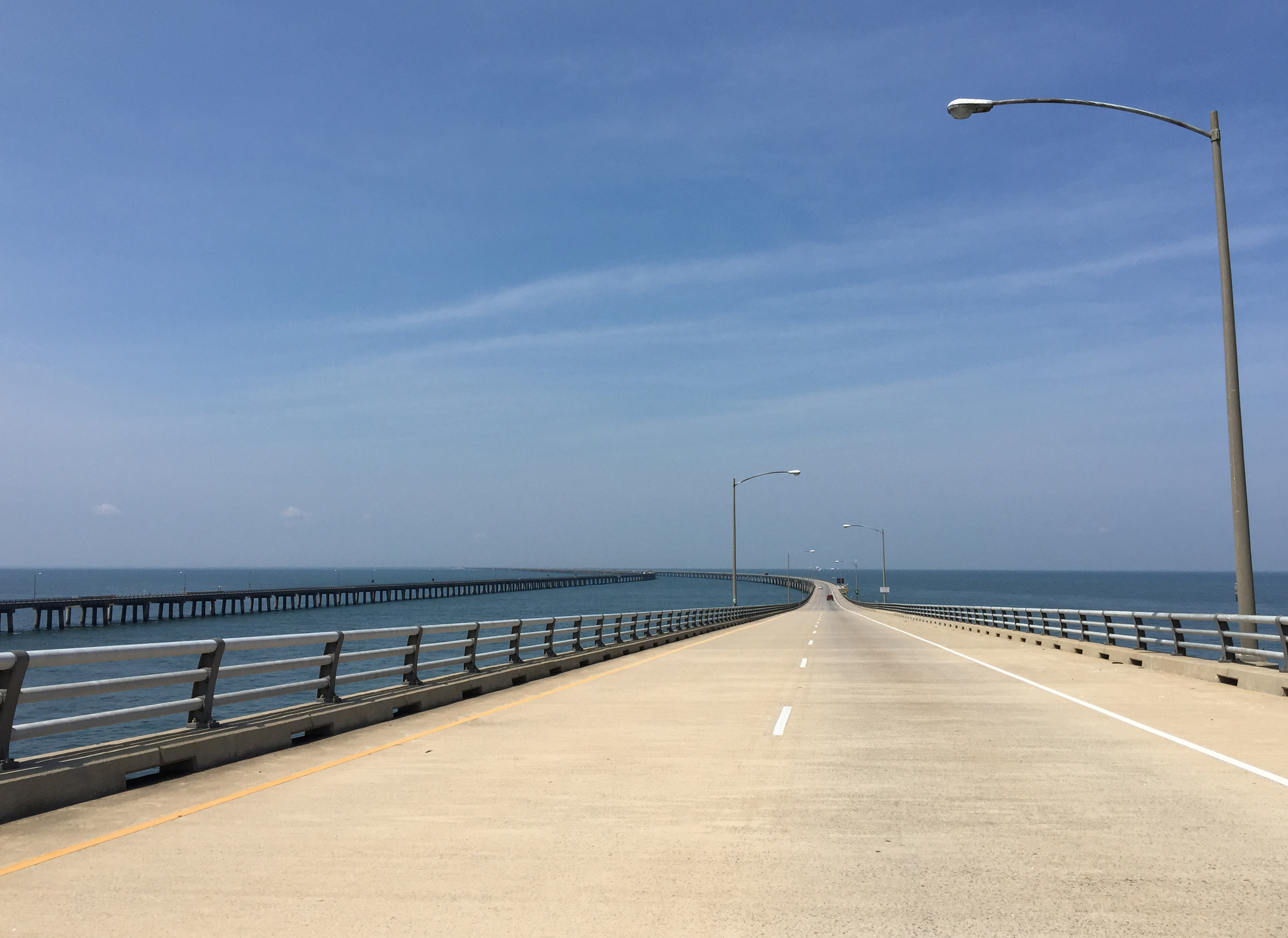
Chesapeake Bay Bridge-Tunnel

Sverdrup & Parcel was an American civil engineering company formed in 1928 by Leif J. Sverdrup and his college engineering professor John I. Parcel. The company worked primarily in a specialty field of bridges. The company's headquarters was located in St. Louis, Missouri.

The firm was the designer of the ill-fated I-35W Mississippi River bridge, Minneapolis, Minnesota, 1964 (collapsed on August 1, 2007). The official report by the National Transportation Safety Board blamed the bridge collapse on a design error by the firm, resulting in the gusset plates having inadequate load capacity.

Some other well-known projects of Sverdrup & Parcel include:

- Amelia Earhart Bridge 1939, Atchison, Kansas
- Sidney Lanier Bridge 1956, Brunswick, Georgia
- Bridge of the Americas 1962 (also known as Puente de las Américas, Thatcher Ferry Bridge), Panama, crosses the Panama Canal
- Chesapeake Bay Bridge-Tunnel, (also known as Lucius J. Kellam, Jr. Bridge-Tunnel) completed in 1964, and named one of the "Seven Engineering Wonders of the Modern World" shortly thereafter.
- Busch Memorial Stadium 1966, St. Louis, Missouri
- Angostura Bridge 1967, Bolivar, Venezuela, crosses the Orinoco River
- Hearnes Center 1972, Columbia, Missouri
- Louisiana Superdome 1975, New Orleans, Louisiana
- Monitor-Merrimac Memorial Bridge-Tunnel 1992, in Newport News, Virginia

Sverdrup & Parcel was succeeded by Sverdrup Civil and ultimately Sverdrup Corporation which in 1999, merged with Jacobs Engineering.
