= Washington Bridge (Washington, Missouri) =

Bridge in Missouri, U.S.

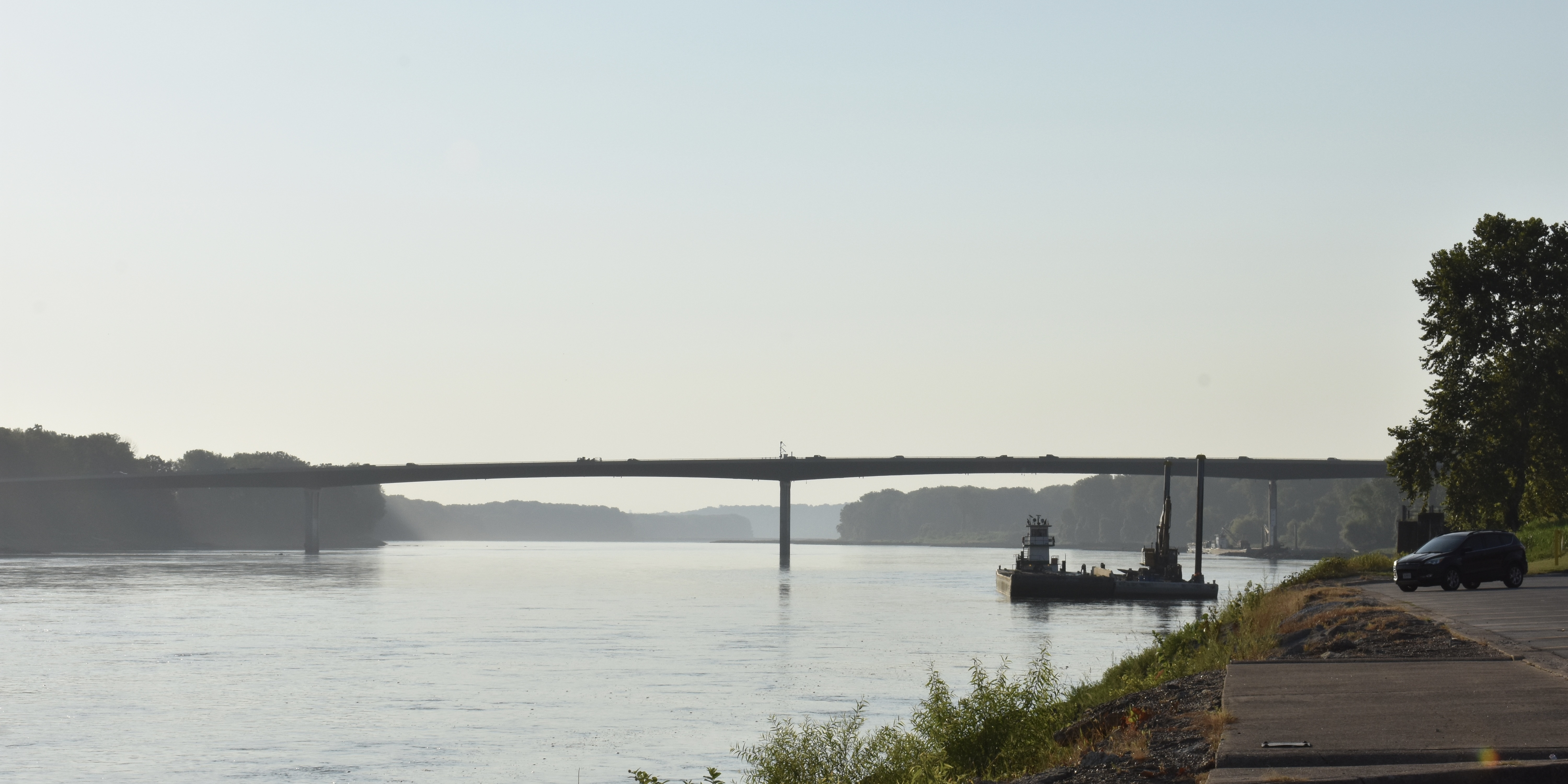
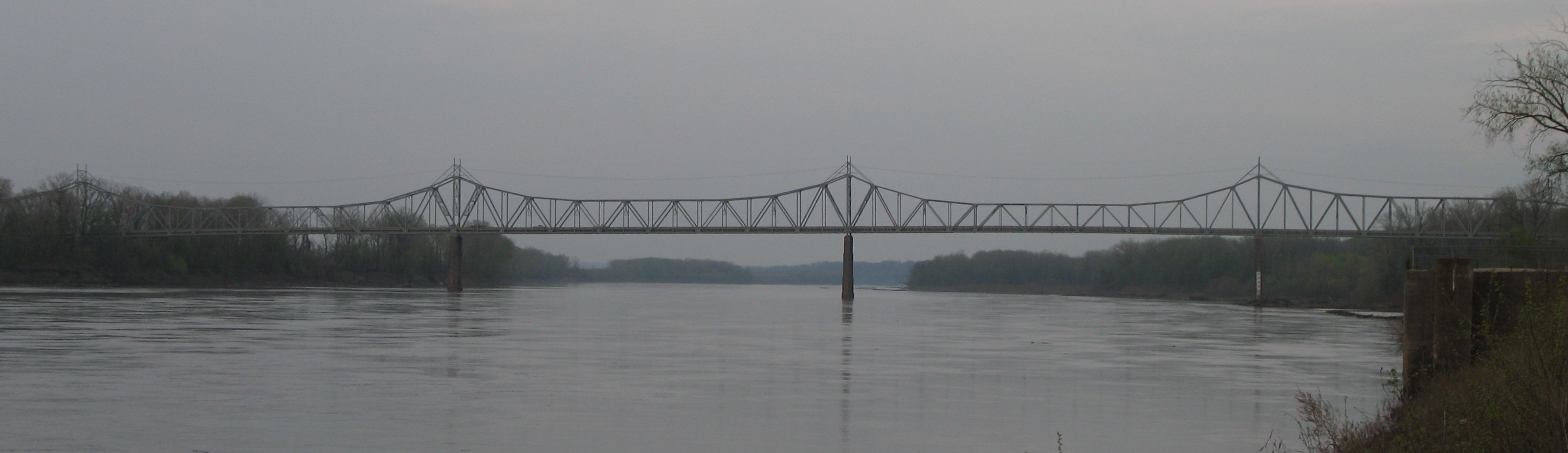
- The current bridge The former bridge, since demolished and replaced
- Coordinates: 38°33′28″N 90°59′53″W

Characteristics
- Material: Concrete girder

History
- Opened: 1934
- Rebuilt: 2018

Location
- Interactive map of Washington Bridge

The Washington Bridge is a concrete girder bridge that carries Route 47 over the Missouri River in Washington, Missouri. It replaces a cantilever truss bridge of the same name that passed between Franklin County, Missouri and Warren County, Missouri. It has also been known as the Route 47 Missouri River Bridge.

== History ==
The original bridge was built in 1934. Its main span was 474.6 feet (144.7 m) and it had a total length of 2,561.3 feet (780.7 m) and a deck width of 22 feet (6.7 m). Its vertical clearance was 14.6 feet (4.5 m). The bridge carried one lane of automobile traffic in each direction.

The Missouri Department of Transportation shut down the bridge at 7:30 am on August 11, 2007, claiming to have discovered problems during regularly scheduled inspections. As the bridge is similar to the I-35W Mississippi River bridge which collapsed in Minnesota, locals have speculated that the inspection and closure were related to this incident. This resulted in a 60 mile (100 km) round-trip detour to the nearest open crossing over the Missouri river. The bridge was soon reopened, but was again intermittently closed in the following weeks. MoDOT eventually completed a rehabilitation project in 2008 and 2009 as a stopgap measure until funding could be identified to replace the bridge.

Construction on a replacement bridge, located just to the west of the old bridge, began in 2016. The new bridge features wider lanes, shoulders, and a pedestrian path. The new bridge opened to traffic on December 3, 2018. The old bridge was demolished by explosives on April 11, 2019.

== See also ==
- List of crossings of the Missouri River
