= Amelia Earhart Memorial Bridge =

Bridge in the United States

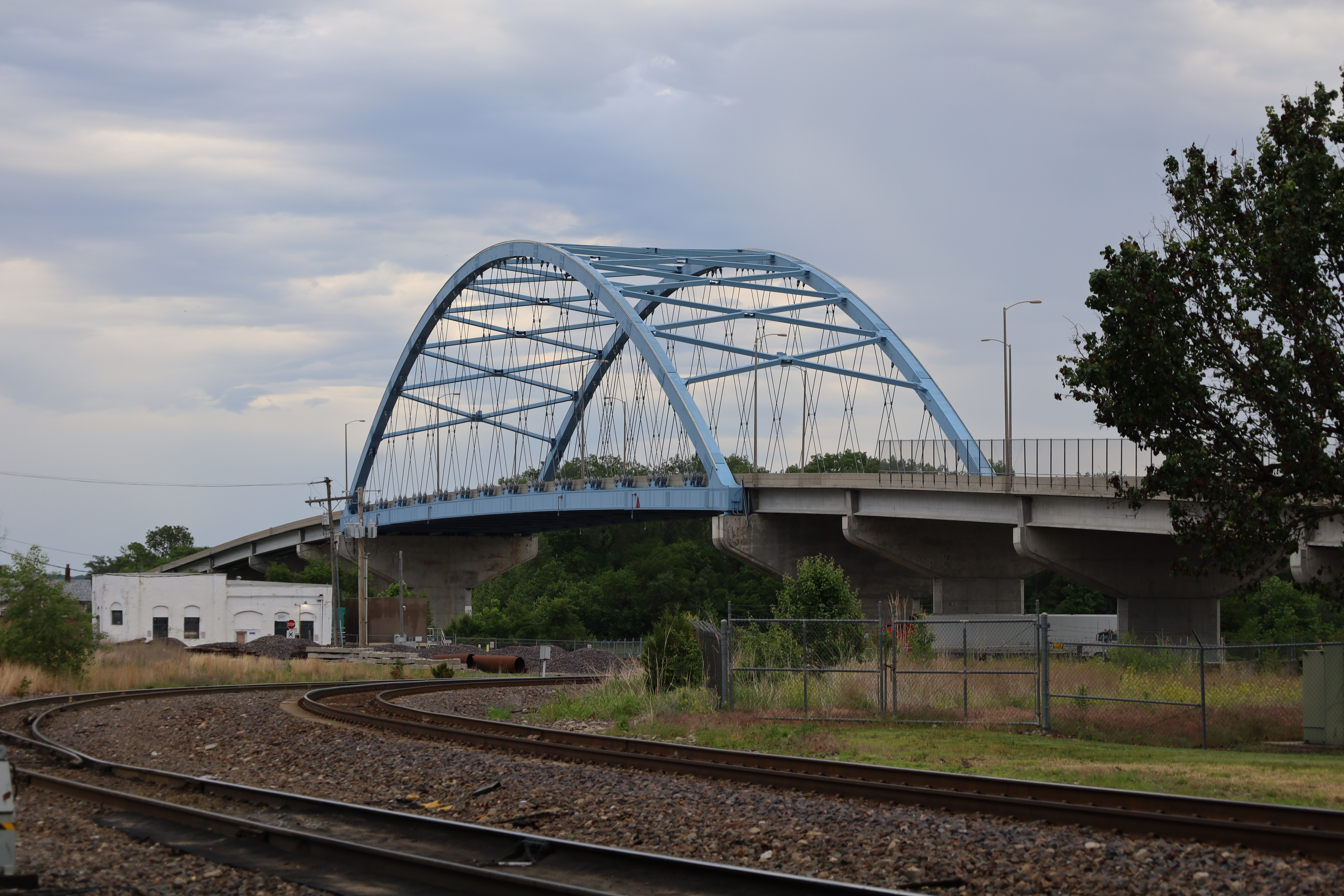
- The bridge in 2025
- Coordinates: 39.5594°N 95.1136°W
- Carries: US 59
- Crosses: Missouri River
- Locale: Atchison County, Kansas and Buchanan County, Missouri
- Maintained by: Kansas Department of Transportation

Characteristics
- Design: network tied arch bridge
- Material: Steel
- Total length: approximately 2,500 feet (760 m)
- Longest span: 527 feet (161 m)

History
- Designer: HNTB
- Construction cost: $59.4M (US$81,360,000 with inflation)
- Opened: December 2012
- Replaces: Amelia Earhart Bridge (see below)

The Amelia Earhart Memorial Bridge is a network tied arch bridge over the Missouri River on U.S. Route 59 between Atchison, Kansas and Buchanan County, Missouri. It opened in December 2012, replacing a previous truss bridge with the same name.

The bridge is decorated with LED lighting which can be programmed to change for various functions. Pictures of the bridge with its arch lights in red, white, blue giving the illusion of a fluttering American flag when reflected in the Missouri River is widely circulated in social media.

== History ==
=== Original bridge ===
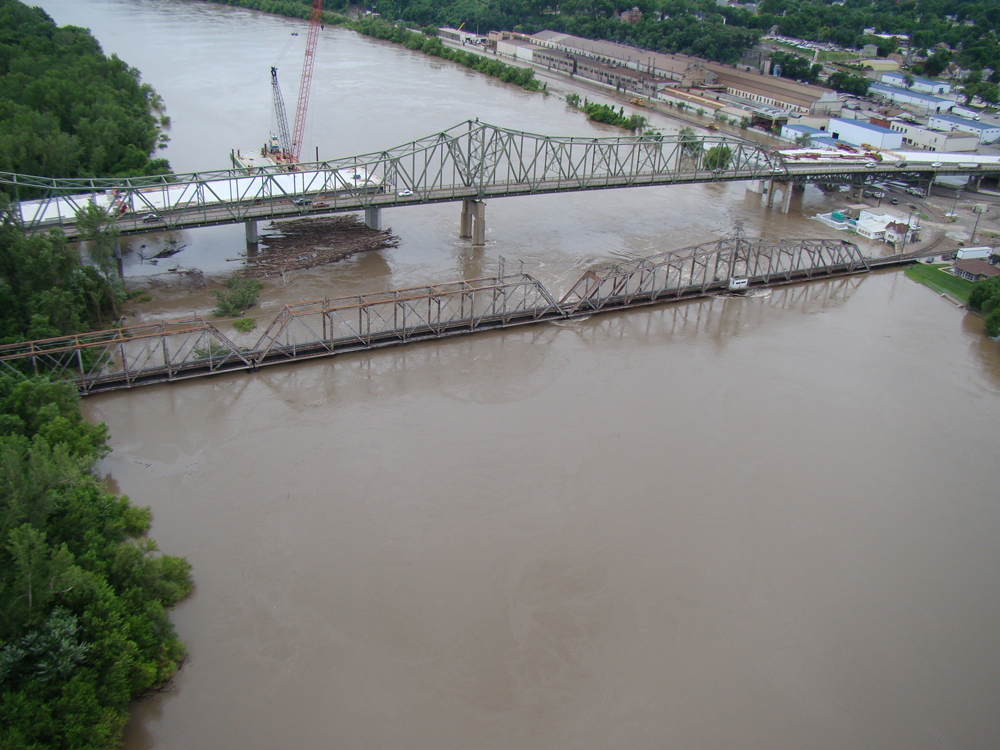
The original Amelia Earhart Bridge during the 2011 Missouri River floods. The new bridge is being constructed behind it, and the Atchison Rail Bridge is visible below

(old) Amelia Earhart Bridge
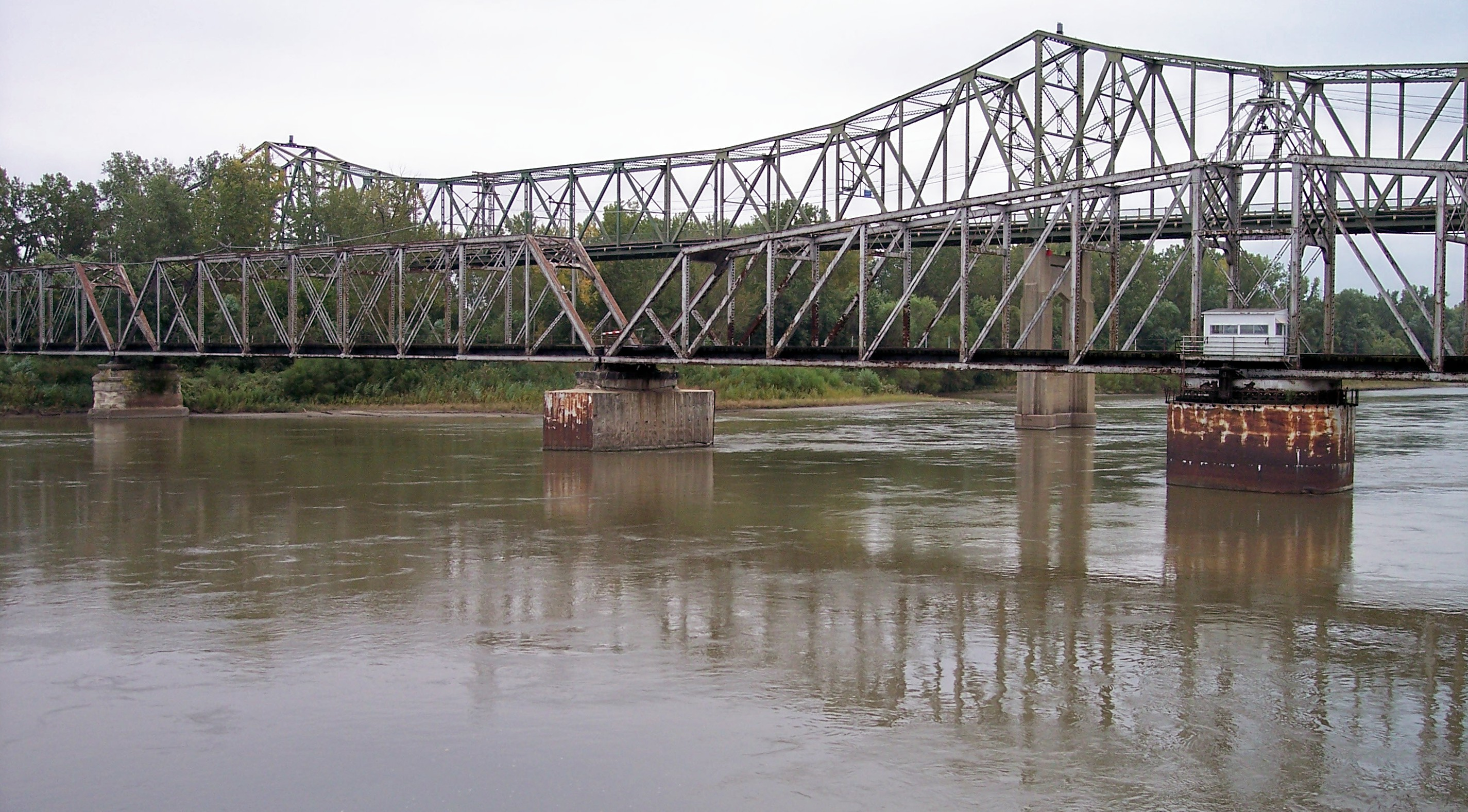
- The Amelia Earhart Bridge (taller, in background) in 2006. The lower bridge in the foreground is a rail bridge.
- Coordinates: 39.5597°N 95.1129°W
- Carries: US 59
- Crosses: Missouri River
- Locale: Atchison County, Kansas and Buchanan County, Missouri

Characteristics
- Design: Cantilevered Truss bridge
- Total length: 2,571.2 feet (783.7 m)
- Longest span: 419.8 feet (128.0 m)

History
- Opened: 1939
- Closed: 2012

The previous, 2-lane, cantilever bridge was built in 1937–1938 by the Works Progress Administration. It was designed by Sverdrup & Parcel. The bridge was originally named the Mo-Kan Free Bridge because it did not charge a toll (the adjacent railroad bridge served as a crossing for rail traffic as well as cars and pedestrians prior to the construction of the free bridge). The bridge was renamed for aviator Amelia Earhart, a native of Atchison, in 1997 to honor the centennial of her birth in Atchison. The illumination along the trusses and xenon spotlights that shine straight up into the sky from the top of the bridge's two peaks were installed and debuted during the Amelia Earhart Centennial Celebration on July 24, 1997.

The bridge was the topic of a preservation debate on whether to replace it with a new four-lane bridge or to keep it and build a second bridge. The old bridge was demolished on October 9, 2013 using linear shaped charges.

=== Current bridge ===
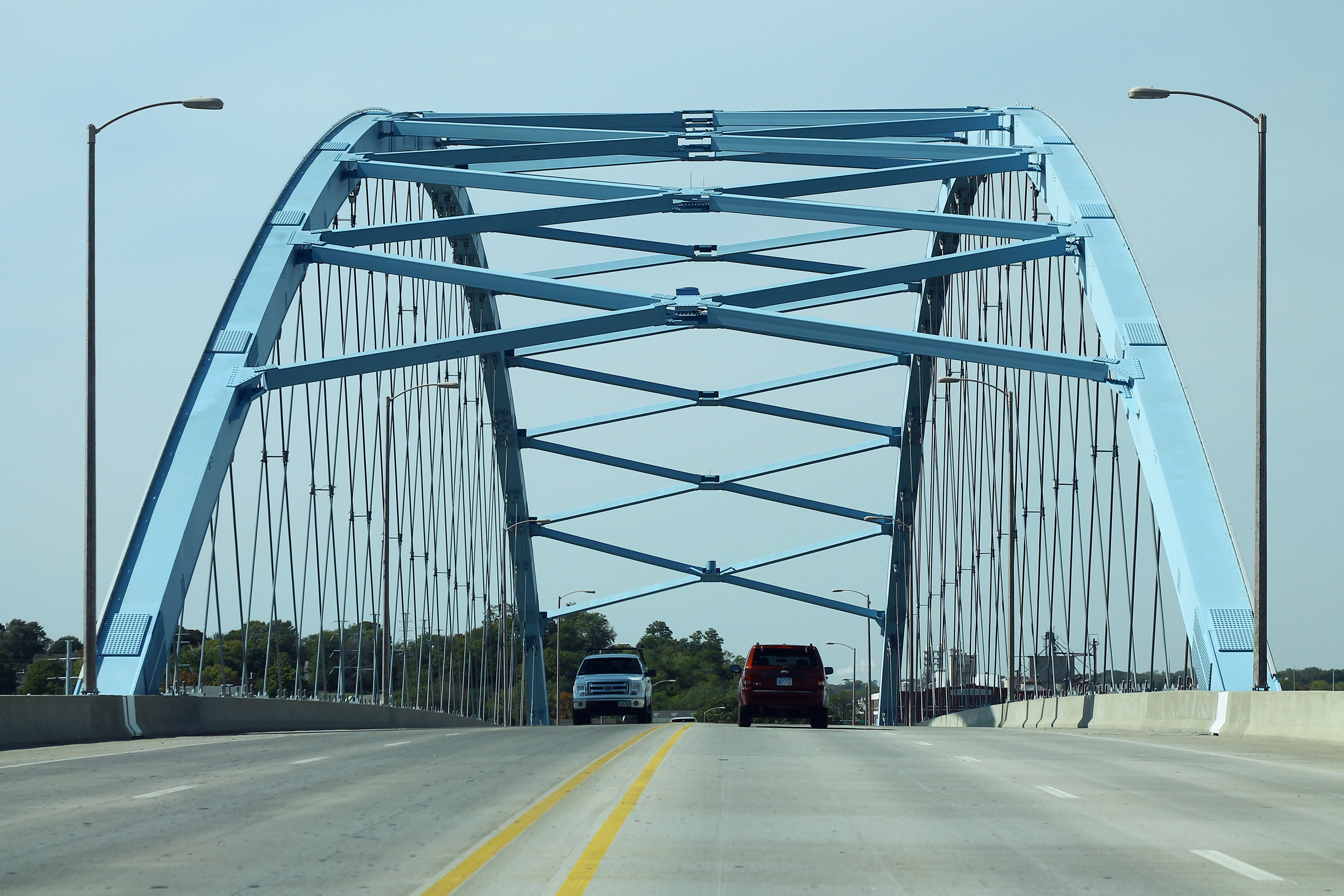
Deck of the bridge in 2020

Plans for replacement of the old bridge with a new four-lane span with 10 foot shoulders were announced in the fall of 2007 by KDOT and MoDOT with construction slated on a new bridge for 2009–2011. The bridge was designed by HNTB.

Because of the Missouri River flood during the summer and fall of 2011, construction was stopped. Work on the bridge was started again toward the end of 2011. The bridge's arch was built on-site, rather than barged in like some tied-arch bridges, and completed on June 14, 2012. The new bridge was opened to traffic in December 2012.

== See also ==
- List of crossings of the Missouri River
