= Operation Fritham =

Allied military operation during WW2 to secure the coal mines on Spitsbergen in 1942

- Part of the Arctic Campaign of the Second World War
- Global view of Norway (Svalbard circled)
Date	30 April – 14 May 1942
Location	Spitsbergen, Norway 78°14′48″N 15°40′38″E
Result	See Aftermath section

Belligerents
Norway; United Kingdom	Germany

Commanders and leaders
Einar Sverdrup (killed 14 May 1942)	Dr Erich Etienne (killed 23 July 1942)

Strength
82 men; SS Selis (transport ship); SS Isbjørn (icebreaker)	4 Focke-Wulf 200 Kondors

Casualties and losses
12 killed; 15 wounded; 2 died of wounds	4 (23 July 1942)

Operation Fritham (30 April – 14 May 1942) was an Allied military operation during the Second World War to secure the coal mines on Spitsbergen, the main island of the Svalbard Archipelago, 650 mi (1,050 km) from the North Pole and about the same distance from Norway. The operation was intended to deny the islands to Nazi Germany.

A party of Free Norwegian troops sailed from Scotland on 30 April 1942, to reoccupy the island and eject a German meteorological party. On 14 May four German reconnaissance bombers sank the ships in Green Harbour; the commander, Einar Sverdrup and eleven others were killed, eleven more members of the party were wounded and most of the supplies were lost with the ships.

On 26 May, P-Peter, a Catalina flying boat, was flown to Spitsbergen; the crew made contact with Fritham Force and destroyed a German Ju 88 bomber caught on the ground. More sorties delivered supplies, attacked German weather bases, evacuated wounded and rescued shipwrecked sailors. Operation Gearbox (30 June – 17 September 1942) superseded Fritham, after HMS Manchester and the destroyer HMS Eclipse delivered 57 more Norwegians and 116 long tons (118 t) of supplies. Operation Gearbox II began on 17 September.

By autumn, the Allied foothold on Svalbard had been consolidated and the Navy used Spitsbergen as a temporary base to refuel Arctic convoy escorts. On 22 September, a Catalina delivered new wireless equipment and in November, the cruiser USS Tuscaloosa and five destroyers delivered more Norwegian troops. In Operation Zitronella (6–9 September 1943) Barentsburg was bombarded by a German naval squadron, including the German battleship Tirpitz, and a landing party disembarked to destroy facilities.

== Background ==
=== Svalbard ===
Topographic map of Svalbard

The Svalbard Archipelago is in the Arctic Ocean 650 mi (1,050 km) from the North Pole. The islands are mountainous, with permanently snow-covered peaks, some glaciated; there are occasional river terraces at the bottom of steep valleys and some coastal plains. In winter, the islands are covered in snow and the bays ice over. Spitsbergen Island has several large fiords along its west coast and Isfjorden is up to 10 mi (16 km) wide. The Gulf Stream warms the waters and the sea is ice-free during the summer. Settlements were established at Longyearbyen and Barentsburg in inlets along the south shore of Isfjorden, in Kings Bay (Quade Hock) further north along the coast and in Van Mijenfiord to the south.

The settlements attracted colonists of different nationalities and the treaty of 1920 neutralised the islands and recognised the mineral and fishing rights of the participating countries. Before 1939, the population consisted of about 3,000, mostly Norwegian and Russian people, who worked in the mining industry. Drift mines were linked to the shore by overhead cable tracks or rails and coal dumped over the winter was collected by ship after the summer thaw. By 1939 production was about 500,000 long tons (510,000 t) a year, split between Norway and Russia.

=== Signals intelligence ===
The British Government Code and Cypher School (GC&CS) based at Bletchley Park housed a small industry of code-breakers and traffic analysts. By June 1941, the German Enigma machine Home Waters (Heimish) settings used by surface ships and U-boats could quickly be read. On 1 February 1942, the Enigma machines used in U-boats in the Atlantic and Mediterranean were changed but German ships and the U-boats in Arctic waters continued with the older Heimish (Hyrad from 1942, Dolphin to the British). By mid-1941, British Y-stations were able to receive and read Luftwaffe W/T transmissions and give advance warning of Luftwaffe operations. In 1941, interception parties code-named Headaches were embarked on warships and from May 1942, computers sailed with the cruiser admirals in command of convoy escorts, to read Luftwaffe W/T signals which could not be intercepted by land stations in Britain. The Admiralty sent details of Luftwaffe wireless frequencies, call signs and the daily local codes to the computers. Combined with their knowledge of Luftwaffe procedures, the computers could give fairly accurate details of German reconnaissance sorties and sometimes predicted attacks twenty minutes before they were detected by radar. In February 1942, the German Beobachtungsdienst (B-Dienst, Observation Service) of the Kriegsmarine Marinenachrichtendienst (MND, Naval Intelligence Service) broke Naval Cypher No 3 and was able to read it until January 1943.

=== Naval operations, 1940–1941 ===
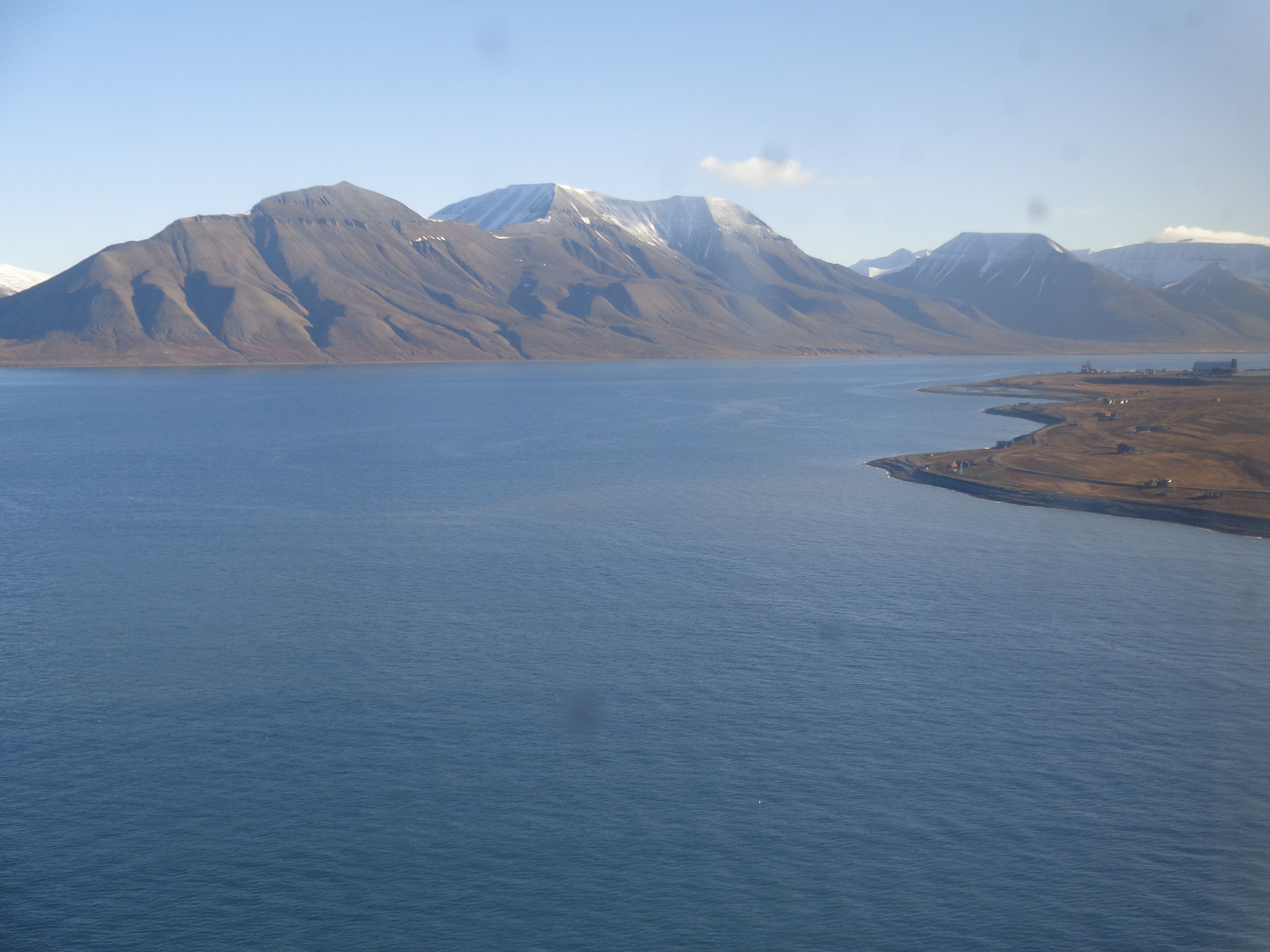
Isfjorden (2012)

The Germans left the Svalbard islands alone during the invasion of Norway in 1940 and apart from a few Norwegians taking passage on Allied ships, little changed; wireless stations on the islands continued to broadcast weather reports. From 25 July to 9 August 1940, Admiral Hipper sailed from Trondheim to search the area from Tromsø to Bear Island and Svalbard, to intercept British ships returning from Petsamo but found only a Finnish freighter. On 12 July 1941, the Admiralty was ordered to assemble a force of ships to operate in the Arctic in co-operation with the USSR, despite objections from Admiral John (Jack) Tovey, commander of the Home Fleet, who preferred to operate further south, where there were more targets and better air cover.

Rear-admirals Philip Vian and Geoffrey Miles flew to Polyarny and Miles established a British military mission in Moscow. Vian reported that Murmansk was close to German-held territory, that its air defences were inadequate and that the prospects of offensive operations on German shipping were poor. Vian was sent to look at the west coast of Spitsbergen, the main island of the Svalbard Archipelago, which was mostly ice-free and 450 mi (720 km) from northern Norway, to assess its potential as a base. The cruisers HMS Nigeria, HMS Aurora and two destroyers departed Iceland on 27 July but Vian judged the apparent advantages of Spitsbergen as a base to be mistaken. The force closed on the Norwegian coast twice and each time was discovered by Luftwaffe reconnaissance aircraft.

==== Operation Gauntlet ====
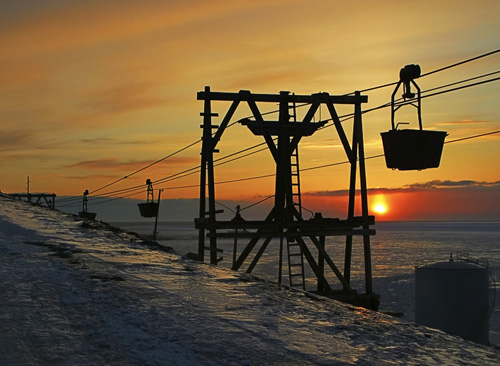
Defunct coal transporter, Longyearbyen, 2008

As Operation Dervish, the first Arctic convoy, was assembling in Iceland, Vian sailed with Force A for Svalbard on 19 August in Operation Gauntlet. Norwegian and Russian civilians were to be evacuated using the same two cruisers, with five destroyer escorts, an oiler and RMS Empress of Canada, a troop transport carrying 645 men, mainly Canadian infantry. (Note: Commander: Brigadier Arthur Potts, 527 Canadians, 25 Norwegians (Captain Aubert), 93 British including 57 Royal Engineers.) The expedition landed at Barentsburg to sabotage the coal industry, evacuate the Norwegian and Soviet civilians and commandeer any shipping that could be found. About 2,000 Russians were taken to Arkhangelsk in Empress of Canada, escorted by one of the cruisers and the three destroyers, which rendezvoused with the rest of Force A off Barentsburg on 1 September.

Normal business was kept up at the Barentsburg wireless station by the Norwegian Military Governor Designate, Lieutenant Ragnvald Tamber; three colliers sent from the mainland were hijacked along with a seal ship MS Selis, the icebreaker SS Isbjørn, a tug and two fishing boats. The Canadian landing parties re-embarked on 2 September and the force sailed for home on 3 September, with 800 Norwegian civilians and the prizes. The two cruisers diverted towards the Norwegian coast to hunt for German ships and in stormy weather and poor visibility early on 7 September, found a German convoy off Porshanger near the North Cape. The cruisers sank the gunnery training ship Bremse but two troop transports, with 1,500 men aboard, escaped. Nigeria was damaged, thought to have hit a wreck but the naval force reached Scapa Flow on 10 September. (Note: After the war it was surmised that Nigeria had hit a mine.)

=== Operation Bansö, 1941–1942 ===
Location map of Longyearbyen (in red) in Svalbard

After Operation Gauntlet (25 August – 3 September 1941) the British had expected the Germans to occupy Svalbard as a base for attacks on Arctic convoys. The Germans were more interested in meteorological data, the Arctic being the origin of much of the weather over western Europe. By August 1941, the Allies had eliminated German weather stations on Greenland, Jan Mayen Island, Bear Island (Bjørnøya) and the civil weather reports from Spitsbergen. The Germans used weather reports from U-boats, reconnaissance aircraft, trawlers and other ships but these were too vulnerable to attack. The Kriegsmarine and the Luftwaffe surveyed land sites for weather stations in the range of sea and air supply, some to be manned and others automatic.Wettererkundungsstaffel 5 (Wekusta 5) part of Luftflotte 5, was based at Banak in northern Norway, once the facilities were ready. The He 111s and Ju 88s of Wekusta 5 ranged over the Arctic Ocean, past Spitsbergen and Jan Mayen, towards Greenland; the experience gained made the unit capable of the transport and supply of manned and automatic weather stations.

After the wireless station on Spitsbergen had mysteriously ceased transmission in early September, German reconnaissance flights from Banak discovered the Canadian demolitions, burning coal dumps and saw one man, a conscientious objector who had refused to leave, waving to them. Dr Erich Etienne, a former Polar explorer, commanded an operation to install a manned station on the islands but winter was imminent. Advent Bay (Adventfjorden) was chosen for its broad valley, a safer approach for aircraft; its subsoil of alluvial gravel was acceptable for a landing ground. The south-eastern orientation of the high ground did not impede wireless communication with Banak and the settlement of Longyearbyen (Longyear Town) was close by. A north-west to south-east airstrip with dimensions of about 1,800 by 250 yd (1,650 by 230 m) was marked out, which was firm when dry and hard when frozen but liable to become boggy after rain and the spring thaw. The Germans used the Hans Lund Hut as a control room and wireless station, the Inner Hjorthamn Hut to the south-east being prepared as a substitute. The site was given the code name Bansö (from Banak and Spitsbergen Öya); ferry flights of men, equipment and supplies began on 25 September. He 111, Ju 88 and Ju 52 pilots gained experience of landing on soft ground, cut with ruts and boulders.

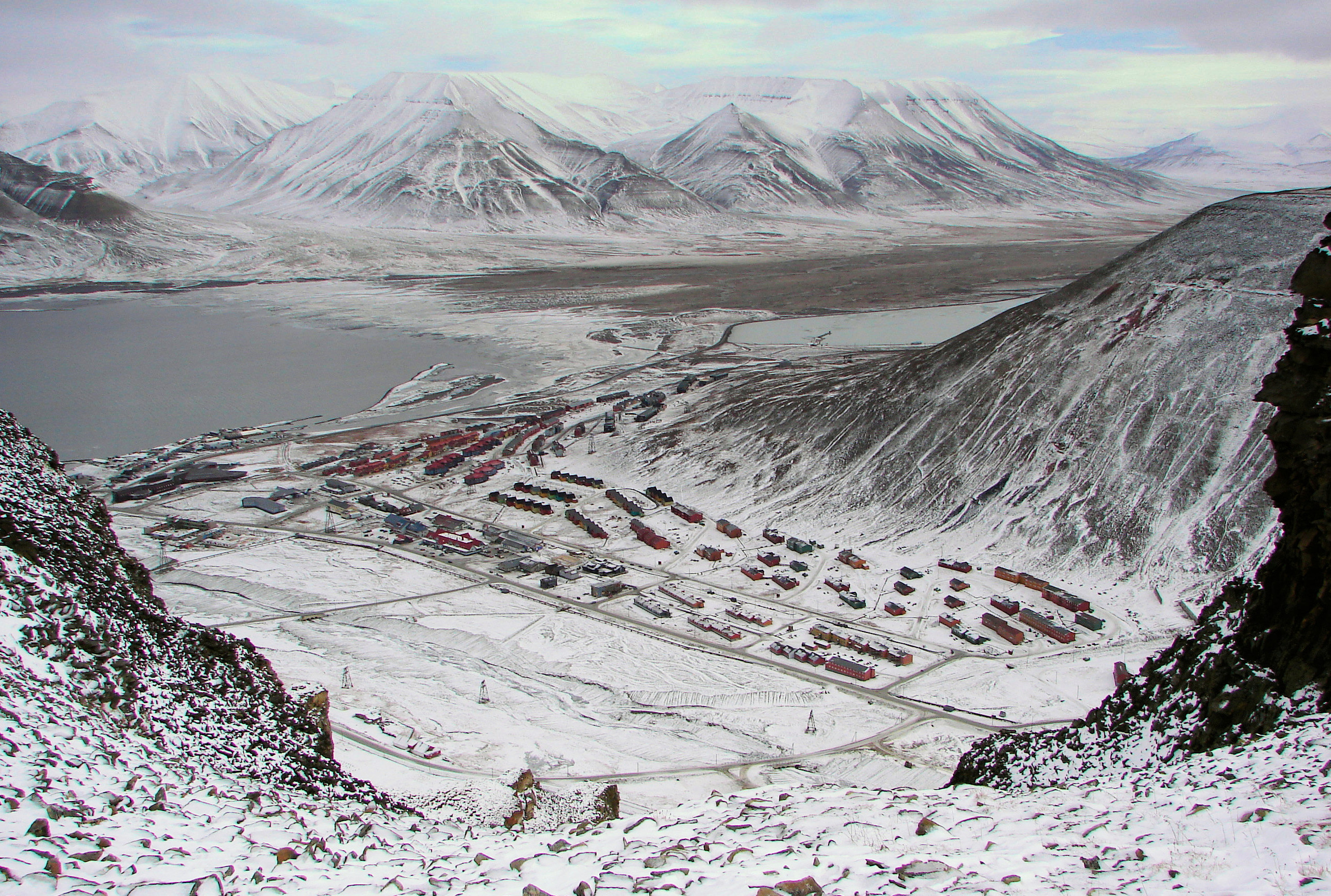
View of Longyearbyen, Adventsfjorden and Adventdalen (2006)

The British followed events from Bletchley Park through Ultra, which was made easier by German willingness to make routine use of radio communication. Four British minesweepers en route from Arkhangelsk were diverted to investigate and reached Isfjorden on 19 October. A Wekusta 5 aircraft crew spotted the ships as they prepared to land and the thirty men at Adventfjorden quickly were flown to safety by the aircraft and two Ju 52 transport aircraft. Adventfjorden was deserted when the British arrived but some code books were recovered; when the ships left, the Germans returned. After 38 supply flights Dr Albrecht Moll and three men arrived to spend the winter of 1941–1942 transmitting weather reports. On 29 October 1941, Hans Knoespel and five weathermen were installed by the Kriegsmarine at Lilliehöökfjorden, a branch of Krossfjord in the north-western Spitsbergen. (Note: On 24 August 1942, the Knoespel group was repatriated by U-435, after being attacked by a party from Operation Gearbox.) Aircraft landings were riskier in winter, when the landing ground or an ice-covered bay was frozen solid, because soft snow on top could pile up in front of the wheels of the aircraft and jerk it to a stop or prevent it from reaching take-off speed when departing. The blanket of snow could also cover holes, into which a wheel could fall, potentially to damage the undercarriage or propeller.

The Moll party at Adventfjorden called for aircraft when the weather was adequate and after making low and slow passes, to check the landing ground for obstructions, the pilot decided whether to land. On 2 May 1942 an aircrew dropped off a box at Banak containing a Kröte ("toad"), an automatic weather station connected to a long-range radio. (Note: Kröte (toad), a nickname for an automatic, unmanned weather station, containing a thermometer, barometer and a radio powered by nickel-cadmium batteries to transmit data. The first type used in 1942 was compact and could be carried by an aircraft. A 1943 model had a longer-range aerial and was small enough to be delivered by the torpedo-tube of a U-boat.) As soon as weather permitted, it was to be flown to Bansö and the Moll party brought back. It took until 12 May for a favourable weather report to reach Banak and a He 111 and a Ju 88 were sent with supplies and the technicians to install the Kröte. The aircraft reached Adventfjorden at 5:45 a.m. and after a careful examination of the ground, the Heinkel pilot eventually landed, keeping its tail well up out of the snow. The main wheels quickly pushed a drift of packed snow in front of them and the aircraft almost nosed over. The ten crew and passengers joined the ground party who welcomed them enthusiastically, having been alone for six months; the Ju 88 pilot was warned off by a flare and returned to Banak.

== Prelude ==
=== Naval operations, 1942 ===
Early in 1942, the Admiralty took a new interest in Svalbard, encouraged by representations from the Norwegians, concerned about deterioration in the state of the coal mines. The Norwegians anticipated a big increase in demand for their coal once the war was over. The Norwegians offered a small number of men, local to Svalbard and well used to Arctic conditions, along with Selis and Isbjørn, ships brought from Svalbard by Operation Gauntlet. The Norwegians assured the British that their men would need only a basic military training, since they were islanders returning to their homeland, not an invasion force, a fact which would also honour the terms of the Svalbard Act (1925). The local concerns of the Norwegians and the strategic interests of the Admiralty in supporting Arctic convoys to the USSR coincided and a reconnaissance flight by a Catalina from Sullom Voe was arranged.

=== British reconnaissance flights ===
==== 4−5 April ====
Catalina flying boat J-Johnnie (Flight-Lieutenant [F/L] D. E. Hawkins) of 240 Squadron Royal Air Force (RAF) flew to Svalbard on 4–5 April, carrying Major Einar Sverdrup of the Norwegian Brigade (former director of Store Norske Spitsbergen Kulkompani [the Great Norwegian Spitsbergen Coal Company]) of Svalbard and Lieutenant Alexander (Sandy) Glen (RNVR), leader of the Oxford University Arctic Expedition, 1935–1936. The flight was logged as a Special flight - secret operation, to reconnoitre the settlements on the island and survey a possible convoy route to the islands along the edge of the polar ice between Jan Mayen and Svalbard, to check on the icing in the fiords of Spitsbergen and look for signs of German occupation. Isfjorden was bathed in sunshine when the Catalina arrived and Sverdrup and Glen could see the coal dumps at Grumantbayen and Barentsburg smouldering from the Operation Gauntlet demolitions but no smoke over Longyearbyen. No footprints or other signs of habitation could be seen in the snow around the settlements; Sverdrup and Glen reported that the islands were uninhabited and that a landing would be unopposed. The 2,500 mi (4,000 km) round-trip from Sullom Voe took 26 hours, at an unusually early time of year for flights so far north.

==== 11 April ====
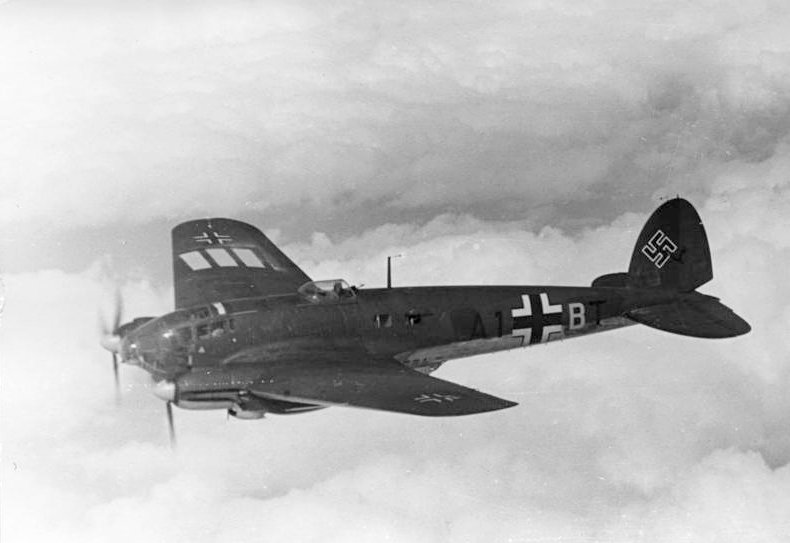
Example of a Heinkel He 111

On 11 April, a flight "to the limit of endurance" was ordered to find the edge of the ice between Jan Mayen and Bear Island, to survey a possible convoy route north of the island. At Longyearbyen, in Advent Bay, pylons of the conveyor system that removed coal from mines could be seen toppled on their side, another result of Operation Gauntlet. At the edge of the settlement, two masts and tracks around nearby buildings were seen; the pilot followed ski tracks along the valley and spotted a He 111 with people around it. The Catalina gunners fired 1,500 rounds and claimed the destruction of the bomber; the gunners also reported that they hit some of the men and a hut. To conserve fuel, the British broke off, headed home and cancelled the look at Bear Island. The aircraft reached North Unst in Shetland at 4:00 p.m. and their report to Coastal Command HQ was forwarded to the Admiralty, which signalled to Isbjørn to alert Sverdrup.

An inspection by the Heinkel pilot revealed that it had been hit by only thirty bullets and none of the 14 men present had been wounded. The aircraft had been holed in several places but seemed airworthy and was quickly unloaded. The pilot and wireless operator got on board and flattened the snow by taxiing back and forth, compacting snow under the wheels but not causing ruts. At first it took full power to move but after six runs it was possible to attempt to take off; there was a river terrace below the end of the strip and falling off this gave the Heinkel enough speed to remain airborne. An icy wind blew through the holes in the cockpit glazing, the starboard engine began to lose oil and the wireless broke down but the aircraft reached Banak; the bullet damage was found to be worse than thought.

==== 12 May ====
After the reconnaissance flight with Sverdrup and Glen in early April, followed by a failure to penetrate the fog on 4 May, plus the Admiralty interest in the position of the Arctic ice, another ice survey from Bear Island to Svalbard, thence to Jan Mayen and the area west of Bear Island was ordered on 10 May. A reconnaissance of Isfiorden, Cape Linné and Advent Bay was to be flown before 12 May. Healy was absent and a 210 Squadron Catalina crew led by Flight Lieutenant G. G. Potier flew the sortie. The route of the Catalina was from Muckle Flugga in the Shetland Islands, to Jan Mayen to check the ice edge in the Greenland Sea, thence to Isfiorden, making landfall at 5:50 a.m. The British picked up a Luftwaffe wireless signal from Svalbard, saw smoke over Barentsburg and took photographs, which revealed no sign of footprints or ski tracks. Moments after warning off a Ju 88 from landing, the Germans at Bansö heard another aircraft approaching from the north.

=== Plan ===
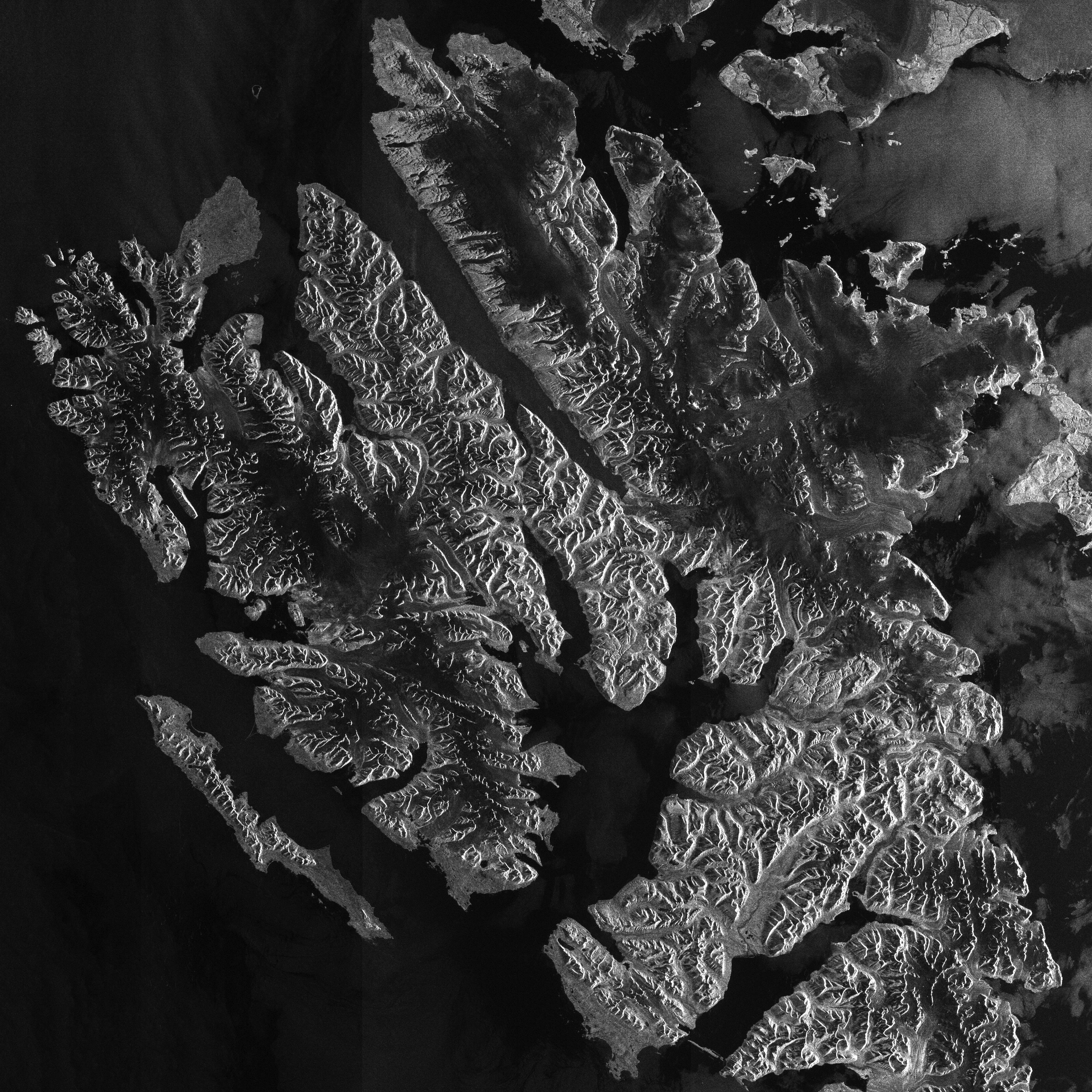
Radar photograph of Spitsbergen (Envisat, 2011)

The British and Norwegians planned Operation Fritham, the dispatch of a party of 92 men from the River Clyde in the ice-breaker D/S Isbjørn and the sealer Selis (Lieutenant H. Øi Royal Norwegian Navy) to Spitsbergen, the main island of the Svalbard Archipelago, via a stop at Akureyri on the north coast of Iceland, to take on supplies. The party from the Norwegian Brigade was accompanied by Glen, Lieutenant-Colonel A. S. T. Godfrey and Major Amherst Whatman, Royal Signals, a specialist wireless operator. The flights by Healy and his crew were part of the operation but had another objective, laid down in a memorandum of 24 April 1942 from HQ RAF Coastal Command to the AOC 18 Group and revealed only to Healy. Glen briefed the crew that the purpose of ice reconnaissance was to track the recession of the Arctic ice pack, which varied in speed from year to year. Fog, often freezing, usually appeared at the edge of the ice and the melt rate after the winter freeze was to be studied for two months. On 30 April 1942, Isbjørn and Selis sailed from Greenock.

British eavesdropping on German Enigma messages revealed that German reconnaissance aircraft had flown over Svalbard on 26 and 27 April. On 3 May the flight plan prepared by Healy to Svalbard was amended to include a look at Isfjorden and an attempt to land Glen and Godfrey at Cape Linné. Sverdrup was warned that there were probably Germans at Kings Bay the day before the party sailed from Iceland and a landing there was cancelled; the vessels made for Isfiorden to land at Green Harbour, where the ice might have melted. The ships were soundly built and each carried a 20 mm Oerlikon anti-aircraft gun but none of the party had been trained in their use. The wireless equipment was patently inadequate; Whatman repaired and operated the set but had little hope that it would work much beyond Jan Mayen Island; the set broke down on the voyage to Iceland and was not reliable for the rest of the voyage. Glen and Godfrey flew to Akureyri by Catalina, rendezvoused with the expedition and the ships sailed on 8 May, with a copy of the ice report made after the reconnaissance flight three days earlier. The ships had to take a more easterly course than intended but were able to hug the polar ice, with little risk of being seen by an aircraft once north-east of Jan Mayen.

== Operation Fritham ==
=== 13–15 May ===
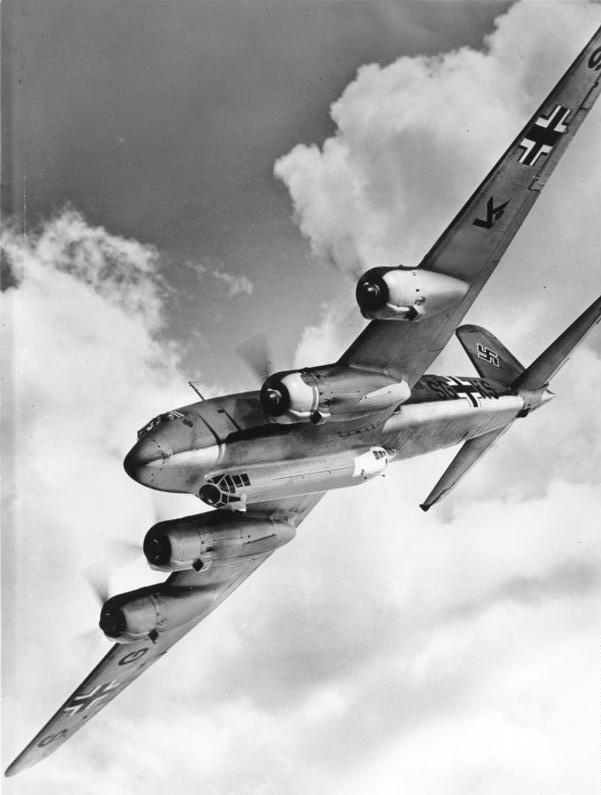
A Focke-Wulf Fw 200 Condor of the type that sank D/S Isbjørn and MS Selis.

The Norwegian ships reached Svalbard on 13 May and entered Isfjorden at 8:00 p.m. but the warning from the Admiralty about German aircraft was not received. A party went ashore at Cape Linné and reported no signs of human habitation, after which the ships sailed east along Isfiorden and found that they could not reach Advent Bay because of the ice. The ships turned south to Green Harbour to land at Finneset instead. The bay was covered in ice up to 4 ft (1.2 m) thick, which Isbjørn could break but only slowly. Godfrey wanted to unload the ships at once and sledge the stores ashore but Sverdrup ordered a rest break first, the men having been cooped up on the voyage. The ice breaking was delayed until after midnight on 14 May and parties were sent to scout Barentsburg and Finneset.

At 5:00 a.m. a Ju 88 flew from Cape Linné to Advent Bay along Isfiorden at 600 ft (180 m). The aircraft did not deviate from its course but the ships could not have gone unseen. The scouting parties found no one at their objectives but took until 5:00 p.m. to get back, by when Isbjørn had cut a long channel in the ice but was still well short of Finneset. Sverdrup insisted on making for the landing stage at Barentsburg to unload quicker. After bashing through the ice for 15 hours, at 8:30 p.m. four FW 200 Condor long-range reconnaissance bombers appeared. With such high valley sides the bombers arrived without warning and near-missed the ships on the first and second bombing runs, the bombs bouncing on the ice before exploding, return fire from the Oerlikon guns having no effect. The third bomber hit Isbjørn which sank immediately and Selis was soon set on fire, members of the party being thrown into the air by explosions or jumping onto the ice, as the gun crew exchanged fire with the bombers.

The men scattered to evade the bombers' strafing runs and the Condors flew away after about thirty minutes. There was nothing left of Isbjørn but a hole in the ice, Selis was still burning and thirteen men were dead, including Sverdrup and Godfrey. Nine men had been wounded (two men died later of their wounds) and sixty members of the party survived unharmed. The cargo in Isbjørn, arms, ammunition, food, clothes and the wireless had been lost. Barentsburg was only a few hundred yards across the ice and the evacuation during Operation Gauntlet eight months earlier, had left the houses untouched. Plenty of food was found because it was the Svalbard custom to stock up before winter and a larder of flour, butter, coffee, tea, sugar and mushrooms was soon assembled. During Gauntlet, the local pig herd had been slaughtered but the arctic cold had preserved the meat; wild duck could be plundered for eggs. An infirmary was also found for the wounded, which was still stocked with dressings. Luftwaffe Ju 88 and He 111 bombers returned on 15 May but the Fritham party took cover in mine shafts.

=== 16–31 May ===
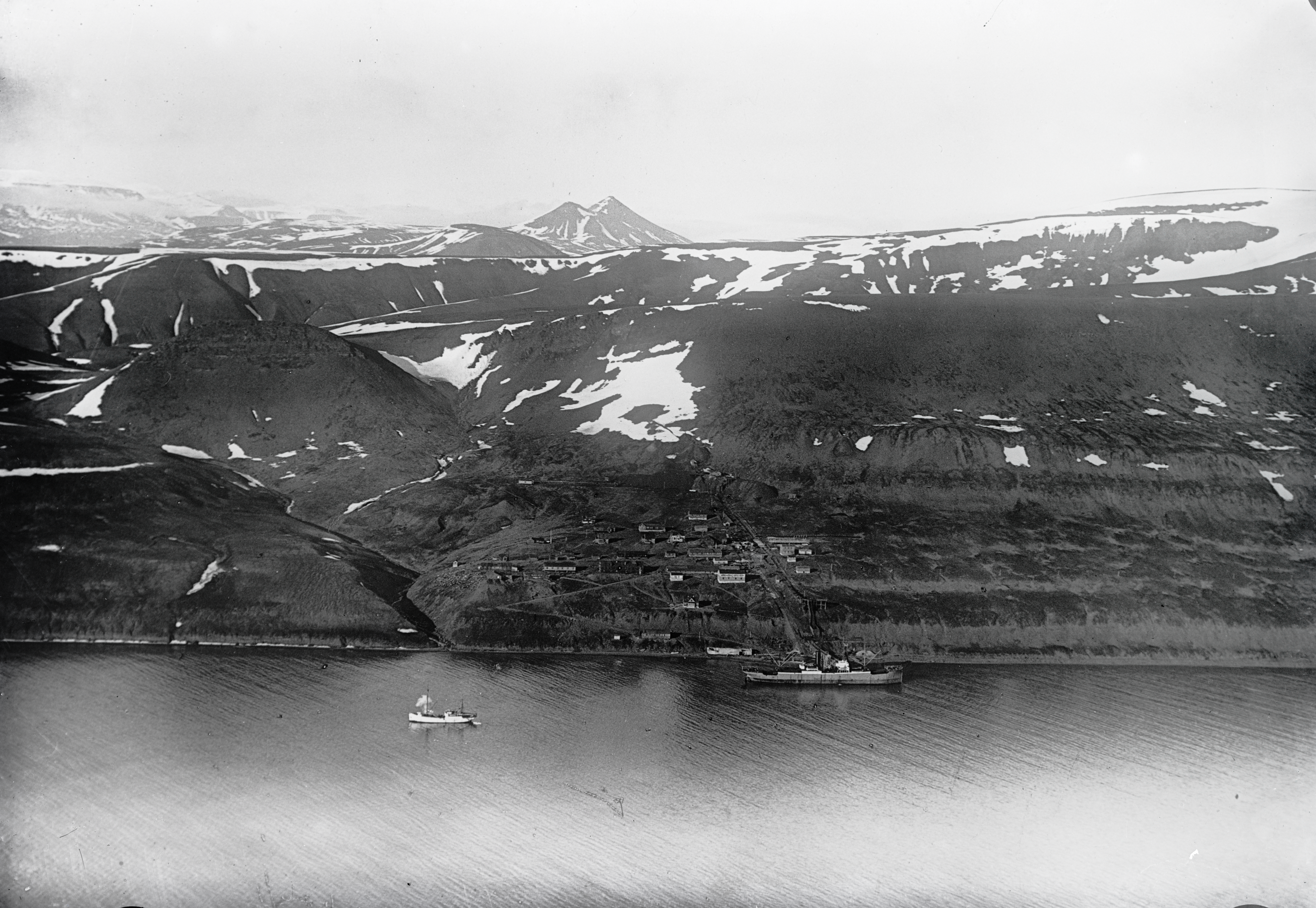
Barentsburg, 1923

Most days a German aircraft flew east towards Advent Bay or north to Kings Bay and the time taken for the return flight showed that the aircraft had landed, suggesting that both places were occupied by the Germans. When the damaged Heinkel had flown back to Banak on 13 May, twelve men had been left behind and Luftwaffe weather reconnaissance aircraft were diverted to Isfiorden to drop messages and supplies. One of the early flights overflew the two Fritham ships which were taken for a Soviet Special Forces unit and led to the attack by the Condors. A flight on 15 May found that the second ship was still alight and that the German party at Bansö had marked a runway on the ice in Advent Bay. The bomber managed to land and take off, which was the beginning of the supply flights necessary to get the Kröte operational. The Heinkel pilot, who had been strafed by the Catalina, flew along the west coast to avoid a risky climb over the mountains and to take a look at Barentsburg. The second ship had sunk, there were tracks around buildings but no people to be seen; most significant was the absence of tracks to Longyearbyen, which meant that landing would not be interfered with. The Heinkel landed on the ice but the pilot saw that puddles formed which meant that the ice was unsafe. The ground party used a tractor to pull sledges with the supplies from the aircraft. The Kröte worked as soon as it was switched on and the Heinkel returned to Banak.

Other aircraft flew to Svalbard but the puddles became holes and on 18 May a Heinkel snagged a wheel as it landed and the propeller was damaged; the undercarriage sank further and the aircraft became stranded. Flights had to be cancelled until the airstrip at Bansö had been cleared of snow and dried out; until then the German meteorological party was stuck. On their flights the Luftwaffe crews spotted ski tracks in Coles Valley and overflew Barentsburg on the way to dropping supplies to the party at Bansö. Command of the Norwegians had devolved to Lieutenant Ove Roll Lund who sent 35 men to Sveagruva, over Grøndalen, Reindalen, the Nordenskiöld Land mountains and then down into Van Mijenfjorden near Bellsund. The journey took the fastest skiers 36 hours and one man was lost down a crevasse. The fitter men left behind tended the wounded, lay low when the Luftwaffe was around and made plans for offensive action once they had been reinforced. Small parties went out on 16 and 17 May to reconnoitre the Germans in Advent Bay, lightly equipped, camouflaged by any white sheets or garments they could find and living off supplies in huts along the route. From Barentsburg the parties moved to Cape Laila, across Coles Valley to the mines between Endalen and Advent Valley. The parties met on the south-east slopes of Longyearbyen from which the airstrip at Bansö could be watched.

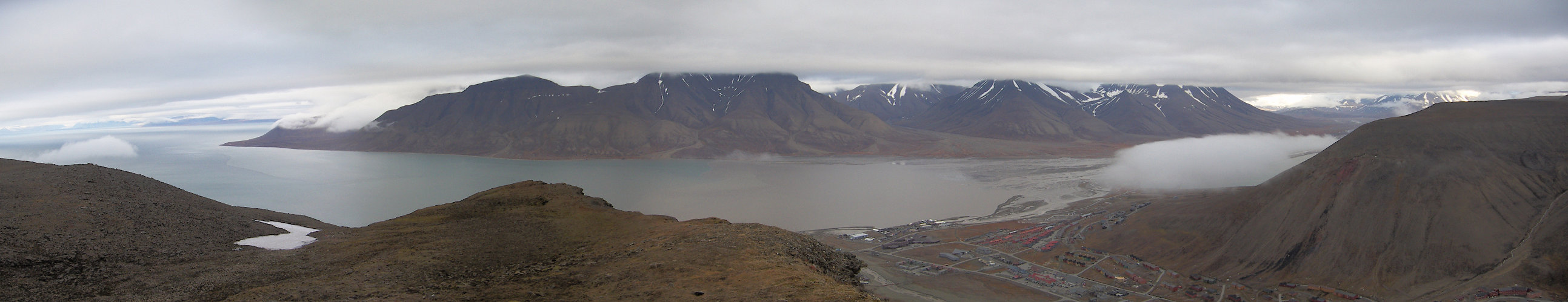
Panorama of Longyearbyen from Advent Fjord (2008)

The Norwegians could see the German party and several men went to the Hans Lund Hut, quietly to withdraw when they heard a generator. The party burst into a different hut, to be confronted by a dog, which was placated when Glen said "Hello" (the dog was called "Ullo"). The parties could not conceal their ski tracks at Coles Valley but criss-crossed them to mislead the Germans and returned to Barentsburg unharmed, certain that the Germans were not numerous enough to attack. The wounded looked forward to the arrival of a Catalina. A signal station was established in a hut north of Barentsburg close to Cape Heer and the mouth of Green Harbour, in anticipation of the British aircraft flying down Isfjorden. The three watchers had shelter, warmth and a convenient mine entrance for a bolthole. An Aldis lamp was refurbished and powered by accumulators and Russian batteries; the three men waited, hoping that they would not signal to a Luftwaffe aircraft by mistake. By the end of May, the rival parties were in improvised bases in fjords heading south from Isfjorden, ten minutes' flying time apart but the land journey between was too rough for a serious expedition by either side. The Germans were only 500 mi (800 km) from their base, were in wireless contact and confident of relief once their landing strip drained. The Norwegians had come home but help was 1,000 mi (1,600 km) away and they were out of touch.

=== Reconnaissance and supply flights ===
==== 25 May ====
The Admiralty received no message from the Fritham party and on 22 May a Catalina crew were briefed to reconnoitre Spitsbergen with the itinerary Isfjorden, Cape Linné, Barentsburg, Advent Bay and Kings Fjord but not informed that the Admiralty already knew what had happened through Ultra intercepts. After a test flight on 23 May to try new navigational equipment the sortie began at 11:38 a.m. on 25 May and flew under the cloud base beyond the most northerly RAF map at 71° 31' north and continued by navigating with an Admiralty chart, reaching the South Cape of Spitsbergen at 11:10 p.m. with the sun not entirely set. The crew took photographs up the west coast to Isfjorden where drifting ice meant that a landing was impossible. At Longyearbyen the crew saw signs of the demolitions made by Operation Gauntlet then saw the He 111 that had been damaged on 18 May still on the ice, supported by the tail and wing tips. The pilot flew the Catalina west along Isfjorden and near green Harbour; smoke was seen followed by the channel cut by Isbjørn and the smoke as seen coming from coal dumps. A light was seen flashing near some huts and messages were passed until 1:45 a.m. when the Catalina had to turn for home, flying through freezing fog before landing at 2:27 p.m. on 26 May. The condition of Fritham Force had been discovered, the ice edge from Bear Island to Spitsbergen Island and for 150 mi (240 km) east of Jan Mayen had been surveyed.

==== 28–29 May ====
Landing in a fiord would have to wait until the ice melted and parachuting supplies from a Catalina were not possible; kit and parachute bags would have to be dropped from the blister positions into snowdrifts, during low, slow passes along the slopes near the fiord. The bags would have long orange streamers and be filled with items hard to break. Carrying the extra weight along with the fuel for such long flights led the crew to dump everything not essential, including their parachutes. The crew expected that the party would be eating frozen food and packed medical supplies, clothing and creature comforts, a Thompson gun and flare gun with ammunition and a signalling code. P-Peter took off at 4:32 p.m. on 28 May into fog and navigated by dead reckoning and radar bearings to avoid freezing fog, at heights between 150–380 ft (46–116 m). Landfall was made after 4:00 a.m. on 29 May and the Catalina was flown at 100 kn (190 km/h; 120 mph) as the bags were dropped near huts at the bottom of the valley slope as the crew kept watch for German aircraft. Receiving lamp signals from the ground was difficult because, unbeknownst to the Catalina crew, the Fritham party could hear a German aircraft above the clouds and were not sure which aircraft to reply to. At 6:40 a.m. P-Peter turned for home in the same flying conditions plus a tail wind and were back at Sullom Voe by 5:00 p.m. after a flight of 24 hours and 38 minutes. (Note: At 11:17 p.m. on 31 May, P-Peter took off with arms and ammunition but was forced to abort, after 17 1/2 hours in the air, due to icing about 200 mi (320 km) from Bear Island. It was certain that the conditions were the same all the way to Spitsbergen and at 8:54 a.m. the pilot turned back and landed at 5:04 p.m. Storms prevented flying for several days and the crew was able to rest.)

==== 6–7 June ====
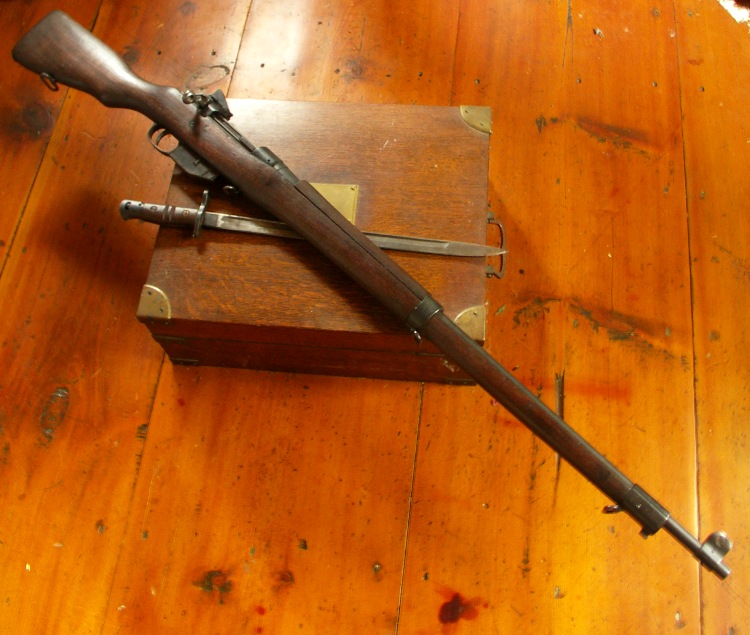
Ross rifle (photographed in 2010)

Catalina P-Peter, with 24 Ross rifles and 3,000 rounds of ammunition, food, medical supplies and the post, took off at 7:21 a.m. for Spitsbergen, flying low again. With a higher cloud base than usual the crew saw what looked like a He 111 at 11:21 a.m. and reached the island by 5:01 p.m. The bags were thrown out and then the Catalina landed; two men went ashore with the mail and other stores as the crew on the boat fended off ice floes, as the six wounded Norwegians were ferried out by boat, which was sent back with a 2 imp gal (9.1 L; 2.4 US gal) jar of rum, cigarettes and tobacco.

The landing party returned with reports at 8:00 p.m. and the Catalina was airborne ten minutes later, reaching Sullom Voe at 7:17 a.m.; the wounded were taken to the sick bay and then flown to the Norwegian hospital in Edinburgh. In London, the Admiralty had received the reconnaissance reports of 26 and 29 May, which with the dispatches from Fritham Force persuaded them to reinforce the island by a warship sortie. The Admiralty needed to know if there was a channel through the ice from Bear Island to Spitsbergen and Jan Mayen Island.

==== 14–15 June ====
P-Peter took off at 8:55 a.m. and flew at 150 ft (46 m) to fly under any German radar against a headwind and took ten hours to reach Bear Island. The crew saw no ice until 40 nmi (74 km; 46 mi) north of the island but drift ice further on made a convoy course north of Bear Island impractical. The Catalina reached Barentsburg at 9:03 p.m. and men were seen waving from a hut .5 mi (0.80 km) north of town. The bags were thrown out and the aircraft landed, took Glen, Ross and a Norwegian soldier on board and took off to check the polar ice west of the island towards Jan Mayen, where ice was seen 25 nmi (46 km; 29 mi) short of the island, through which no convoy could sail. P-Peter landed at Akureyri in Iceland at 9:30 a.m. The results of the ice reconnaissance were too sensitive to send by wireless and P-Peter took off for a six-hour flight Sullom Voe, where the results could be sent by telephone. Glen had been on Spitsbergen for six weeks and was called to the Admiralty along with the Catalina pilot to deliver a Report on Operation Fritham, containing details of the situation of Fritham Force, whether reinforcements would achieve the objectives of the operation, an assessment of the German strength on the island and the likelihood of the personnel being replaced by an automatic weather station, to the Director of Naval Intelligence. The Admiralty decided to terminate Fritham and begin Operation Gearbox, a Norwegian venture supplied by the navy and co-ordinated with PQ convoys.

=== Luftwaffe, 14 June – 9 July ===
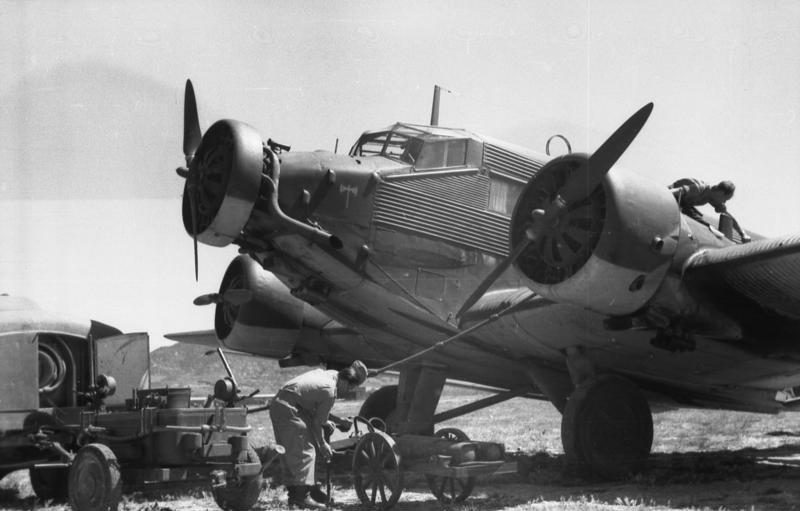
Example of a Ju 52 transport aircraft

The Germans at Bansö had reported the British flight of 26 May and on 12 June, reported that the landing ground was dry enough for a landing attempt. A Ju 88 flew to the island and landed but damaged its propellers as it taxied, increasing the German party to 18 men. The Luftwaffe sent aircraft to Spitsbergen each day but until 26 June, they were warned off with red flares by the ground party. The flight next day was also sent back and the Germans considered using floatplanes instead but the east end of Isfjorden and Advent Bay were full of drifting ice. As midsummer approached, the ice further west near the Allied positions cleared faster.

The Germans reported the 27 June Catalina attack on the Ju 88 which left it a write-off and claimed to have damaged the British aircraft with return fire. On 30 June the party sent a message that the airstrip was dry enough for Ju 52 aircraft and supply flights resumed. The flights were watched by a Norwegian party on an abortive expedition to destroy the German wireless at Advent Bay. On clear days the German pilots flew direct over the mountains and if heavily laden took the coast route past Barentsburg and a Kröte was installed on the north side of Advent bay at Hjorthamn. The last Germans on Spitsbergen, including the weather-reporting party that had been in residence since late1941, were flown back to Norway on 9 July.

== Aftermath ==
=== Analysis ===
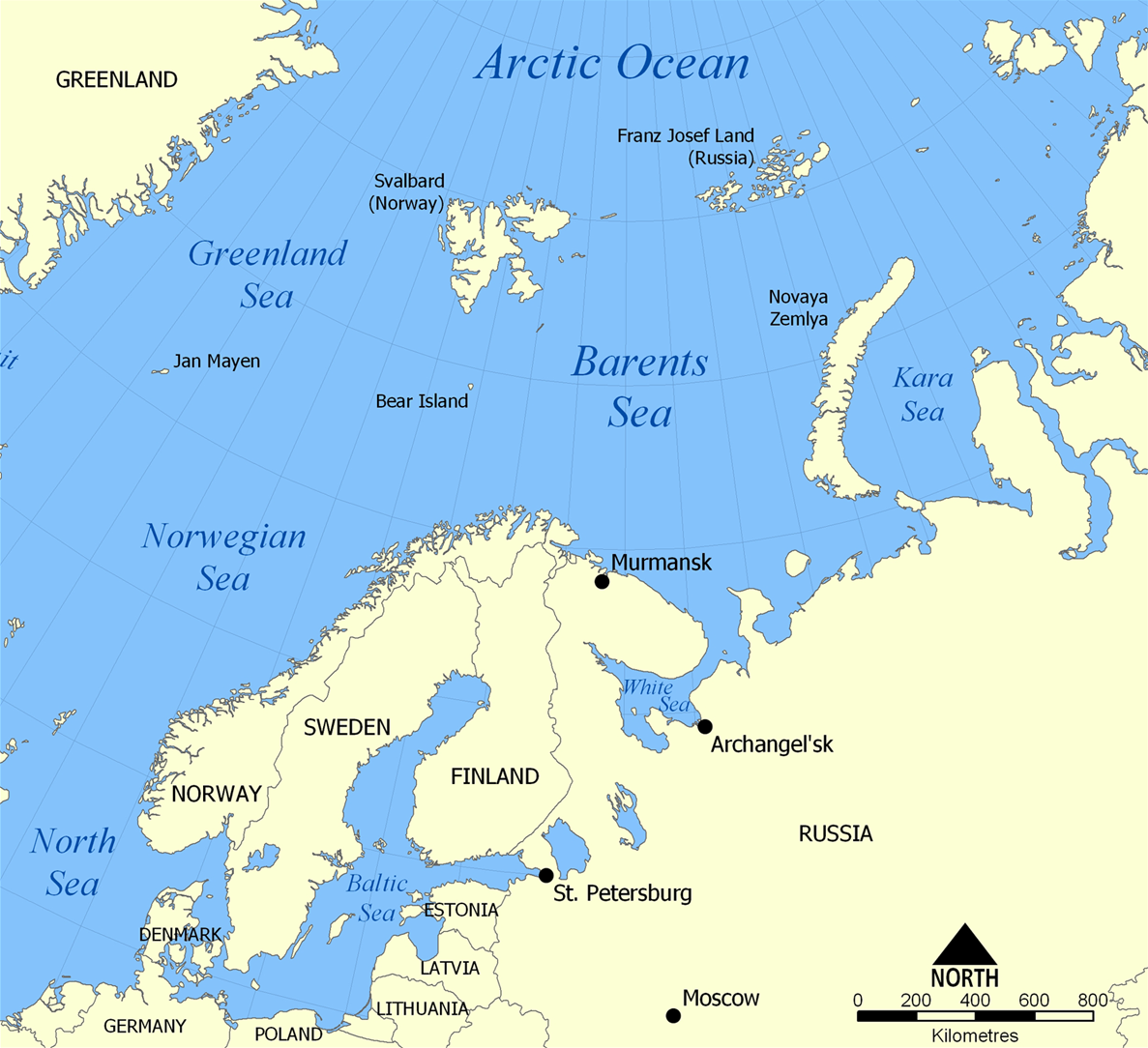
Map of the Barents Sea showing Svalbard, Novaya Zemlya, Franz Joseph Land and north Russia

The remainder of Fritham Force at Barentsburg was consolidated by the reinforcements of Operation Gearbox, a weather station was set up and wireless contact with the Admiralty regained. Ullring reported the oversight with the Colt machine-guns, arranged for Catalina supply fights, provided weather and sighting reports, protected Wharman and his apparatus for research into the ionosphere and prepared to attack German weather stations wherever they could be found. The survivors of Operation Fritham provided excellent local knowledge and with the arrival of the Gearbox personnel, could do more than subsist and dodge attacks by German aircraft.

Catalina N-Nuts flew to Spitsbergen on 13 July with the Colt parts and other supplies, thence to Hope Island (Hopen) another 100 nmi (190 km; 120 mi) and follow the edge of the polar ice as far as possible before turning to Grasnaya on the Kola Inlet or Lake Lakhta near Arkhangelsk in north Russia. After resting, the crew were to fly the aircraft back to where they had left off, fly to a point halfway between Novaya Zemlya and Franz Joseph Land (78° north) then return via Cape Nassau on Novaya Zemlya, to search for survivors from PQ 17. During PQ 18, the shorter-range destroyer escorts were able to refuel from the oilers in Lowe Sound, which was made possible by the RAF reconnaissance flights, Operation Fritham and its sequels.

=== Subsequent operations ===
==== Operation Gearbox ====
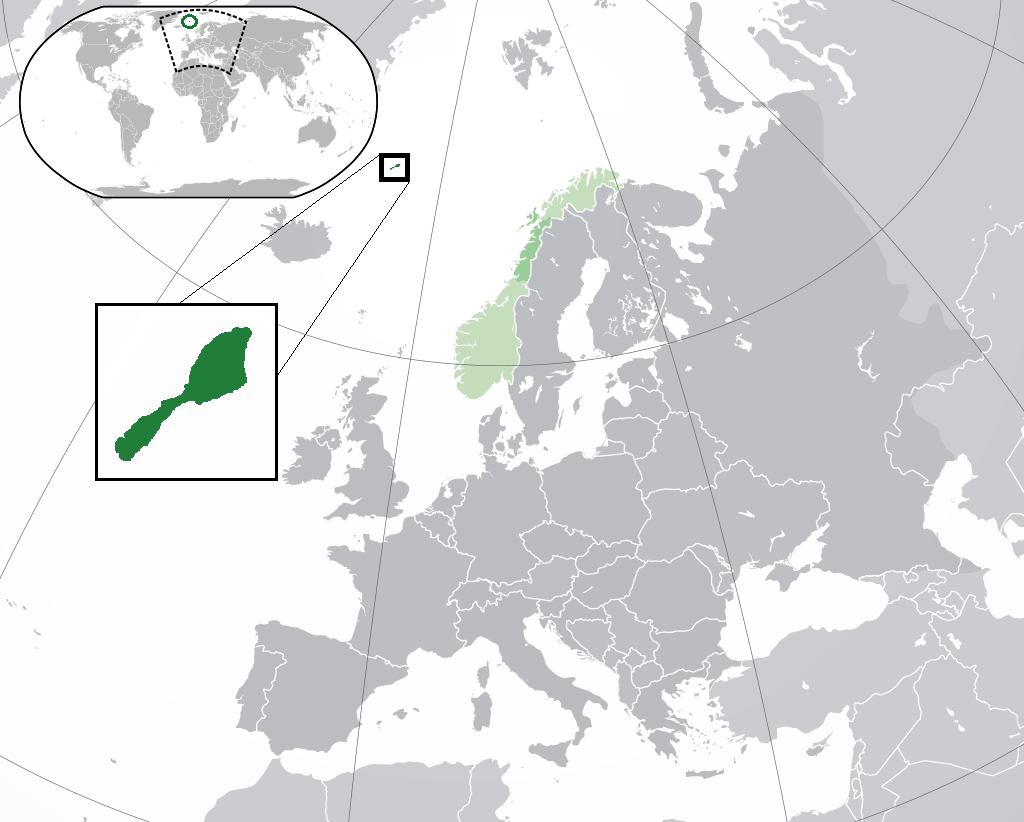
Jan Mayen location map

Manchester and Eclipse delivered Operation Gearbox, 57 Norwegian reinforcements for Fritham Force. The ships arrived at Seidisfjord in Iceland on 28 June and departed on 30 June, to appear part of the escort force of PQ 17 if sighted by a U-boat near Jan Mayen Island. The ships then turned north, to approach Isfjorden from the west and arrived on 2 July. The ships kept their engines running as the Norwegians and 116 long tons (118 t) of supplies, including short-wave wireless, anti-aircraft guns, skis, sledges and other Arctic warfare equipment were unloaded. Cranes were pulled back from the quay, boats hidden and the stores camouflaged. By 5 July, four Oerlikons and M2 Browning machine-guns had been set up. On 3 July an aircraft was heard flying to and from Longyearbyen and a Junkers Ju 52 was seen later in the day. On 23 July, a Ju 88 of Wekusta 5 (Weather Squadron 5) flew a sortie over Advent Bay to reconnoitre the extent of the Allied interference with the German Kröte (automatic weather station). As the aircraft flew low towards Hjorthamn and made a steep turn, Niks Langbak a Selis gunner, shot down the bomber; the crew were buried and code books salvaged from the wreckage.
