= Edvard Sverdrup =

Norwegian theologian (1861–1923)

Johan Edvard Sverdrup (22 June 1861 – 21 January 1923) was a Norwegian educator, author and church leader. Sverdrup was one of the key theologians in the Church of Norway in the first few decades of the 1900s.

== Biography ==
Sverdrup was born in Balestrand Municipality in Nordre Bergenhus county, Norway. He was the son of Harald Ulrik Sverdrup (1813–1891). His father was a vicar and served as a member of the Norwegian Parliament. His uncle Johan Sverdrup (1816–1892) founded the Liberal Party and became Prime Minister of Norway in 1884. His brother Jakob Sverdrup (1845-99) was Bishop of the Diocese of Bjørgvin and served as a member of the Norwegian Parliament. His brother Georg Sverdrup (1848-1907) was a Norwegian-American Lutheran minister who founded the Lutheran Free Church and served as president of Augsburg Seminary.

Edvard Sverdrup attended Bergen Cathedral School and took his final exams in 1880. He graduated as cand.theol. in 1885. From 1885 to 1893 he worked as a teacher at the folk high school in Sogndalsfjøra which had been established by his brother, Jakob Sverdrup. In 1903, he was appointed vicar (sogneprest) in Sulen Municipality.

In 1908, he was among the first teachers at the newly established MF Norwegian School of Theology in Oslo. He was professor there from 1918. He also published several books, many on church history. From 1910 to 1918, he was co-editor with theologian, Christian Ihlen (1868–1958) of the periodical Lutheran Church Official Journal (Luthersk Kirketidende) which had been founded in 1863 by theologian and educator, Gisle Johnson (1822–1894). He was chairman of the board of The Norwegian Lutheran Inner Missionary (Det norske lutherske Indremisjonsselskap) from 1911 to 1923. The organization had been founded in 1868 with the primary goal of promote Christian enlightenment, especially in the proliferation of Christian literature.

== Personal life ==
He was married in 1886 to Maria Vollan (1865-1891). After her death, he was married in 1893 to Agnes Vollan (1866-1952) who was the sister of his first wife. He was the father of educator Mimi Sverdrup Lunden (1894-1955), Einar Sverdrup (1895–1942) CEO of Store Norske Spitsbergen Kulkompani, oceanographer Harald Ulrik Sverdrup (1888-1957) and United States Army General Leif Sverdrup (1898-1976).

== Selected works ==
- Det menneskelige legeme med en kort oversigt over dyrene og planterne. En lærebog for høiere skoler, seminarier, amts- og folkehøiskoler, (1890)
- De sidste ting. Fire foredrag, (1912)
- Den evangelisk lutherske tro. Dens historiske gjennembrud og dens grundsandheter efter den augsburgske bekjendelse, (1915)
- Hvorledes Luther blev reformator, (1917)
- Luther som bibeloversætter, (1917)
- Fra Norges kristenliv. Den norske lutherstiftelse og Det norske lutherske indremissionsselskap 1868–1918, (1918)
- Luthers kamp med Rom. Efter dens historiske forløp til og med Riksdagen i Worms, (1922)
- Fader vor. Tanker ved Herrens bøn, (1922)
- Hauge och Haugeanism, (ed. by T. A. J. Carlson, 1925)
