= Einar Sverdrup =

Norwegian businessman

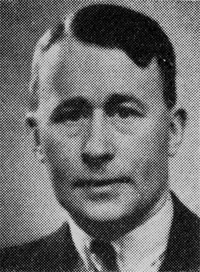
Operation Fritham leader, Einar Sverdrup

Einar Sverdrup (18 December 1895 – 13 May 1942) was a Norwegian mining engineer and businessman. He was the CEO of the Store Norske Spitsbergen Kulkompani, operating at Svalbard. When the integrity of Svalbard was threatened during World War II, he volunteered for a military operation, but was killed in action during Operation Fritham.

== Personal life and career ==
He was born in Sulen Municipality as the son of Edvard Sverdrup and his wife Agnes, née Vollan. His father was stationed in Solund as a vicar. Einar Sverdrup was the grandson of vicar and politician Harald Ulrik Sverdrup, a grandnephew of Johan Sverdrup, a nephew of politician Jakob Sverdrup and theologian Georg Sverdrup, a half-brother of oceanographer Harald Ulrik Sverdrup Jr., and a brother of engineer and military officer Leif Sverdrup and women's rights activist Mimi Sverdrup Lunden. On the maternal side he was a grandson of Ole Vollan, and a first cousin of Harald and Nordahl Grieg.

Einar Sverdrup studied to be a mining engineer in the United States and at the Norwegian Institute of Technology in Trondhjem. In 1923 in Trondhjem he married Dagny Lorck. The couple had three children, and settled in Bærum. Sverdrup eventually became the CEO of the Store Norske Spitsbergen Kulkompani, a Norwegian coal mining company based in Svalbard.

== World War II ==
Before Operation Barbarossa was executed on 22 June 1941, the Svalbard archipelago was treated as a "no man's land". The mining was conducted and controlled by Norwegians and Soviets, but the authorities allowed coal transport to German-occupied Northern Norway. After Operation Barbarossa, however, the attitude changed, and Svalbard was evacuated between July and August 1941. In September 1941, Einar Sverdrup travelled to England. Here, he became involved in a plan to retake Svalbard. He was soon singled out as leader of the operation, and was ranked lieutenant colonel.

The operation was codenamed Operation Fritham. It started on 30 April 1942, when the ships MS Selis and SS Isbjørn departed from Greenock. Sverdrup was on board SS Isbjørn. The expedition reached Svalbard, but on 13 May, Isbjørn was sunk by German aircraft at Grønfjorden, claiming the life of Sverdrup. He was posthumously decorated with the War Cross with Sword.

== Legacy ==
In Svalbard, near the town of Longyearbyen is a place named for him: Sverdrupbyen ("Sverdrup Town"). Nearby, the settlement of Nybyen is sometimes alternatively known as Østre Sverdrupbyen ("East Sverdrupbyen").

There is also a memorial near Sverdrupbyen. The stone obelisk has a metal plaque with the following engraving:

DIREKTOR
EINAR SVERDRUP
FOR INNSATS PÅ SVALBARD
1922–1942
FALT UNDER KAMP I ISFJORDEN
14 MAI 1942
UREDD OG ÆRLIG

which translates to

DIRECTOR
EINAR SVERDRUP
FOR EFFORTS IN SVALBARD
1922–1942
KILLED IN ACTION IN ISFJORDEN
14 MAY 1942
FEARLESS AND HONEST

== Private life ==
Sverdrup was referred to as the "love of the life" of Winifred Brown who was a British adventurer and pilot.
