= Mimi Sverdrup Lunden =

Norwegian educator and writer

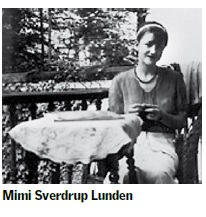
- Born: Maria Sverdrup; 13 June 1894; Sulen, Nordre Bergenhus, Norway
- Died: 8 January 1955 (aged 60); Oslo, Norway
- Occupations: educator, non-fiction writer and proponent for women's rights
- Parent: Edvard Sverdrup
- Relatives: Harald Ulrik Sverdrup (brother); Einar Sverdrup (brother); Leif Sverdrup (brother)

Mimi Sverdrup Lunden (13 June 1894 – 8 January 1955) was a Norwegian educator, non-fiction writer and proponent for women's rights

== Personal life ==
Lunden was born in Sulen Municipality in Nordre Bergenhus, a daughter of Lutheran theologian Edvard Sverdrup and Agnes Vollan (1866–1952). She was the sister of oceanographer Harald Ulrik Sverdrup (1888–1957), United States General Leif Sverdrup (1898-1976) and Einar Sverdrup (1895–1942) CEO of Store Norske Spitsbergen Kulkompani.

In 1918 she married Tallak Lunden (1886–1930), with whom she had two daughters. Her husband was director at Kongsberg Municipal Middle School prior to his death in 1930.

== Career ==
When she was 12 years old, her family moved to Kristiania (now Oslo). She graduated artium in 1912 and began studying Philology at the University of Oslo where she graduated in 1918. Lunden worked for a time as a teacher at Kongsberg Municipal Middle School. After her husband's death in 1930, she completed a course of study at the University of Oslo in 1931. She was employed as a lecturer at Vestheim School and later at Hegdehaugen School in Oslo.

While she still had young children and her husband was seriously ill, she was terminated as a "married teacher". This experience reinforced her lifelong commitment in women's rights. In 1936, she joined the Norwegian Association for Women's Rights (Norsk Kvinnesaksforening). From 1948 she chaired the Norwegian chapter of the Women's International Democratic Federation.

Lunden was also an author. In 1922 she was awarded a prize from the Nansen Foundation. She wrote a number of noted books. Additionally she published articles about issues which concerned her: women's rights, international peacekeeping, and educational issues. Her best-known book is De frigjorte hender from 1941. The book is a study of women's important and varied work in the pre-industrial society. The book also noted that in the industrial age, much of this work was taken over by factories, machines and men.

== Selected works ==
- Kvinnen og maskinen. Kvinnearbeidet i støpeskjeen, 1946
- Foreningsarbeide, en håndbok, 1948
- Barnas århundre, 1948
- Den lange arbeidsdagen, 1948
