= Amherst Barrow Whatman =

British Army officer (1909-1984)

Whatman during the Oxford University Arctic Expedition 1935

Lieutenant colonel Amherst Barrow "Brownie" Whatman MBE (1 November 1909 – 5 November 1984), FIEE, was a British wireless operator and radio engineer. He was the only child of Major Amherst Blunt Whatman and Myrtle Ellen Waller Barrow. He followed the military career and he joined the Royal Corps of Signals.

== Education ==
Born in Exeter, Whatman was educated at Twyford School and during 1923–1927 he attended Winchester College, where he developed an interest for wireless that led to get his first radio call sign around 1927 (6BW). The licence actually was issued to his mother because of him being a junior. The licence permitted 10W output power. At Winchester College he would meet another famous radio amateur, Sir Evan Yorke Nepean, G5YN that went on to be a life-time friendship. In 1929 he joined the Royal Military Academy, Woolwich and in 1933 he moved to Cambridge to study Mechanical Sciences at St John's College. The college was also the home of Andrew Croft, second in command of the Oxford University Expedition to the Arctic (OUEA,1935) and other prominent British explorers like James Wordie.

== Oxford University Arctic Expedition 1935-6 ==
In 1935 the War Office appointed Capt Whatman as the wireless operator for the Oxford Expedition to the Arctic. While in Spitsbergen Island he carried out an important program of research on the Ionosphere in co-ordination with physicist R Hamilton. Whatman had a crucial role in the success of this scientific aspect of the expedition by securing the maintenance of equipment and radio communications during the 14 months. The data collected was analysed at the Radio Research Station in Slough to study the behaviour of radio wave propagation in high latitudes.

== World War II ==
Whatman took part actively in several war theatres. In 1942, Alexander Glen (former leader of the OUAE) recommended Whatman to participate in Operation Fritham as British Liaison Officer. This required him to be seconded to the Navy and temporarily becoming a Special Operations Executive operative. In May 1942, Operation Fritham had a bad start, after losing radio contact the two Norwegian ships sailing to Spitsbergen were stuck in the ice fjord and immediately attacked by German Condor aircraft. As a consequence, the trawlers Isbjiorn and Selis were sunk and 14 troops were killed, amongst them Commander Evesdrup and the British officer A S T Godfrey. In the aftermath of this attack Whatman managed to reestablish communication with HQ. His technical skills proved very effective to communicate with the flying boat Catalina and to get the necessary reinforcements. This was named Operation Gearbox. In November 1943 he returned to the School of Signals as Senior instructor and two years later he moved to HQ ALFSEA.

== Later career ==
Whatman left the Army in 1952 and he was going to spend the next years working as a Radio and Television Engineer for Rediffusion, first in London and later in Preston. He was a British Radio Amateur with call-sign G2BQ and a member of RSGB and RSARS During his retirement he enjoyed the radio hobby, sailing and beekeeping. Along his life, he maintained a strong Christian faith, he was churchwarden for nine years and singer in the choir. Whatman died in Japan while on holiday.

== Honours and awards ==
- Polar medal (silver), 1942
- MBE, 1942
- War Cross, 1943

== Publications ==
1. A. B. Whatman and R. A. Hamilton: «Radio and Magnetic Observations at North-East Land during the Total Solar Eclipse of 19 June 1936», Nature, 9. January 1937
2. A. B. Whatman:"The Oxford University Arctic Expedition, 1935–36, to North East Land" in The Wireless engineer, May 1937
3. A. B. Whatman: "The Oxford University Arctic Expedition to North-East Land 80 North, 20 East in 1935–1936" in The Royal Signals Quarterly Journal, vol.5, April 1937
4. A. B. Whatman: "The Oxford University Arctic Expedition, 1935–1936" in The Royal Signals Quarterly Journal, vol.6, May 1937
5. A. B. Whatman: "The Oxford University Arctic Expedition, 1935–1936" in The Royal Signals Quarterly Journal, vol.6, June 1937
6. A. B. Whatman and R. A. Hamilton: "High-latitude radio observations", Proceedings of the Physical Society, 1938
7. A. B. Whatman: "Observations made on the Ionosphere during Operations in Spitsbergen in 1942–43", Proceedings of the Physical Society. Section B, 1949
8. A. B. Whatman: "Wired Television", Proceedings I.E.E, vol 110, n 2, Feb 1963
