= Erich Etienne =

German geophysicist, polar explorer and pilot (1915–1942)

- Born: 24 February 1915; Leipzig, German Empire
- Died: 23 July 1942 (aged 27); Longyearbyen, Svalbard, Norway
- Occupations: geophysicist, polar explorer, pilot
- Years active: 1936–1942

Dr. Erich W. Etienne (24 February 1915 – 23 July 1942) was a German geophysicist, polar explorer and pilot.

== Early life ==
Erich Etienne was born in Leipzig and studied geophysics in Leipzig and Exeter before going to the University of Oxford on a Rhodes Scholarship in 1934. He then took part in the Oxford University Greenland Expeditions of the Oxford University Exploration Club in 1936 and 1938. In 1939 he received his doctorate under Ludwig Weickmann at the University of Leipzig.

== Second World War ==
During the Second World War, Etienne became a pilot and flight meteorologist in the Luftwaffe. From the autumn of 1940 he was assigned as a weather observer and meteorological advisor to Wettererkundungsstaffel 5 based at Trondheim-Værnes. His doctoral supervisor Weickmann had previously been appointed chief meteorologist at Luftflotte 5. In September 1940 Etienne was assigned to the crew of a Heinkel He 115, which flew reconnaissance missions in preparations for the Axis landing at Jan Mayen island.

In 1941–1942 Etienne led Operation Bansö, a German effort to set up a staffed weather station on Spitsbergen.

Erich Etienne was killed after his Junkers Ju 88 was shot down on July 23, 1942 during a reconnaissance flight over Svalbard's capital Longyearbyen.

== Publications ==
- 1940 Expeditionsbericht der Grönland-Expedition der Universität Oxford 1938. Veröffentlichungen des Geophysikalischen Instituts der Universität Leipzig, Serie 2, Bd. 13. (GND 363590579)
- 1940 Geophysikalische Arbeiten auf einer Grönland-Expedition. Borna-Leipzig. (GND 570149665)
