= Ragnvald A. Tamber =

Norwegian naval officer (1913–1973)

Ragnvald Andreassen Tamber, DSC (10 April 1913 – 14 September 1973) was a Norwegian naval officer. He was highly decorated for his achievements during World War II, and later Rear Admiral in the Royal Norwegian Navy.

He was decorated with the War Cross with Sword, the St. Olav's Medal with Oak Branch, the British Distinguished Service Cross and the Atlantic Star, and the American Legion of Merit.
