= Hans-Robert Knoespel =

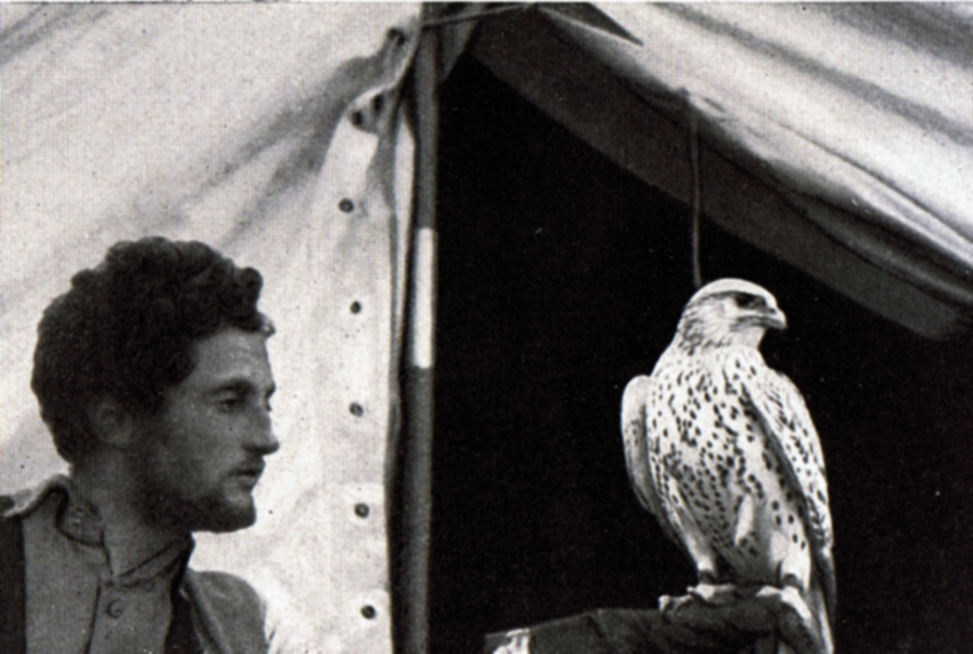
Knoespel with a gyrfalcon, 1938

Hans-Robert Knoespel (7 August 1915 – 30 June 1944) was a German falconer and Arctic explorer. As part of Nazi naval operations, he was involved in setting up a weather station called Knospe on Svalbard near Signehamna. He died in an explosion while destroying a weather station even as the Allies were closing in on the region.

== Biography ==
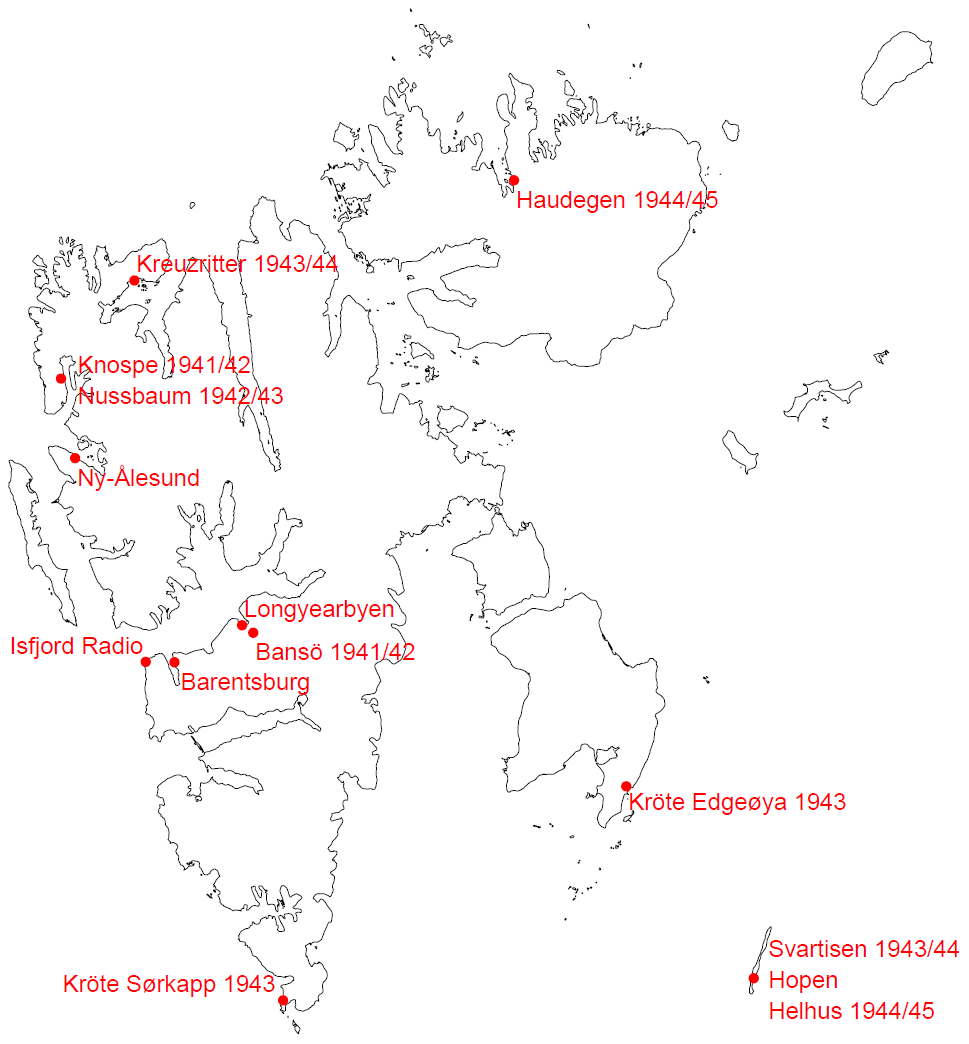
Map showing Knospe station

Knoespel grew up in Schwelm, Westphalia, in a farming family. The farmhouse had an aviary and he became interested in birds at an early age. He worked as a bird ringer and falconer at the Rossitten Bird Observatory in the early 1930s. In 1935, Dietrich Klagges (1891–1971) and Friedrich Alpers (1901–1944), the prime minister and deputy of Braunschweig sought favours with the high command of the German Reich. They invited Hermann Göring, the hunt master for the Reich, and proposed the building of a Reichsjägerhof in Braunschweig. Alpers presented a peregrine falcon named "Komet" to Göring during the Reich hunting festival of November 3, 1935. They also got approval to construct a Reich falconry centre - the "Reichsfalkenhof" in Riddagshausen where Fritz Loges (1898–1955) and Hans-Robert Knoespel were employed from 1937 as falconers. They were involved in training people from around Germany. In 1937, the International Hunting Exhibition was held in Berlin in the presence of Göring. Knoespel made two expeditions, to Iceland (1937) and Greenland (1938) in search of gyrfalcons and other birds. The 1938 expedition to Greenland was funded by the Hermann Göring Foundation and headed by Kurt Herdemerten (1900–1952), a mining engineer and Knoespel. Knoespel's main purpose was to study the gyrfalcon and in the establishment of a research station in Goldhöhe, Krkonoše Mountains, Czechia. Göring was especially interested in obtaining a white gyrfalcon. The expedition captured five gyrfalcons including a very white adult bird which Göring named as "Polarfalke". A painting of the falcon was made by Renz Waller (1895–1979). Knoespel began to study biology at the University of Breslau in 1939. His studies were interrupted by the war and he joined the navy and began to conduct military training at the Goldhöhe station. When the island of Spitzbergen was evacuated in 1941, Knoespel suggested the establishment of a radio-operated meteorological station that automatically transmitted weather information. The station was to be established in Lilliehöökfjorden. He went on a voyage aboard the Sachsen. From October 1941 to August 1942 he was involved in setting up a weather station in Spitsbergen for which he travelled from Tromsø by submarine. In 1943-44 he went again on another operation. On 30 June 1944, the Germans were to be evacuated as the Allies were closing in. He laid an explosive charge to destroy the building and took cover. After waiting for 45 minutes, he left cover and moved towards the building when a delayed explosion killed him. He was buried in next to the station in Spitzbergen.
