= Wettererkundungsstaffel =

Wettererkundungsstaffeln (also known as Wekusta or Westa) were flying units of the Luftwaffe of squadron strength used for weather reconnaissance. Their primary task was to collect weather data in areas that only aircraft could penetrate.

For the planning and conduct of military operations, the ability to produce accurate weather forecasts can be a decisive factor. However, international weather data required for this purpose were not readily available to the German military at the time of the Second World War. The Wehrmacht therefore created a global network of weather stations, weather ships and weather aircraft. The weather aircraft were organised into special squadrons and were usually directly subordinate to the Luftwaffe or Luftwaffenführungskommando. Overall, there were eleven Wekustas, each of which had between three and twelve two-engined aircraft. Many meteorologists were conscripted into the squadrons to collect the weather data and more than 200 of them were killed.

== Units ==
Squadron name	Squadron Identification Code (Geschwaderkennung format)	Formation	Subordinate
Wekusta 1 (also Wekusta/Lfl.1)	B7+_A, (T5)	July 1939	Luftflotte 1
Wekusta 1/Ob.d.L.	T5+_U from July 1942: D7+_H	July 1940 from Wekusta/Ob.d.L.	
Wekusta 2/Ob.d.L.	T5+_V, from July 1942: D7+_K)	July 1940 from Wekusta 2	
Wekusta Ob.d.L	T5+_U	June 1939 from Großraum-Wekusta, from July 1940 Wekusta 1/Ob.d.L.	
Wekusta 3	4B	1939 planned but not established. January 1944 from Wetterkette Stavanger	
Wekusta 5 (also Wekusta/Lfl. 5)	1B+_H, from May 1942: D7+_N	May 1940 from Wetterkette Nord	Luftflotte 5
Wekusta 6	D7+_P	July 1943 from Wekusta Banak	
Wekusta 7	K4+_A	November 1944	
Wekusta 26	5M, from June 1944 C5+_H	June 1939, later 6./Aufkl.Gr. 122, June 1944 Neuaufstellung	Luftflotte 2
Wekusta 27	Q5	June 1943 from parts of Wekusta 26	
Wekusta 51	4T+_H	June 1939	Luftflotte 3
Wekusta 76	5Z+_A	December 1940	Luftflotte 4

Notes:
The squadron identification code painted on the side of the aircraft was based on the standardized Geschwaderkennung four-place alphanumeric characters used by the Luftwaffe's combat wing and group-sized units, two characters on either side of the Balkenkreuz national insignia. For example, from the table above, B7 + _A = B7 _A where _ is replaced by the identification letter of the individual aircraft
Ob.d.L. = Oberbefehlshaber der Luftwaffe [Commander-in-chief of the Luftwaffe]
Lfl.= Luftflotte

== Notable personnel ==
- Hans Bonath (1919–2004, Knight's Cross recipient)
- Erich Etienne (1915–1942, geophysicist)
- Hans Heinrich Euler (1909–1941, physicist)
- Leo Gburek (1910–1941, geophysicist)
- Martin Teich (1911–2004, a meteorologist at the German Weather Service and weatherman for German public-service television broadcaster ZDF)
