= Operation Gearbox II =

- Part of the Arctic Campaign of the Second World War
- Global view of Norway (Svalbard circled)
Date	September 1942 – 7 September 1943
Location	Svalbard, Norway 78°14′48″N 15°40′38″E
Result	Norwegian–British victory

Belligerents
Norway; United Kingdom	Germany

Commanders and leaders
Albert Tornerud	

Casualties and losses
31 prisoners of war	

Operation Gearbox II (17 September 1942 – 7 September 1943) was a Norwegian and British operation during the Second World War on the Arctic island of Spitsbergen in the Svalbard Archipelago. Operation Fritham, the first attempt to establish a base had been defeated when the two ships carrying the force were sunk by Luftwaffe bombers on 14 May.

In Operation Gearbox (30 June – 17 September 1942), 57 Norwegian reinforcements with 116 long tons (118 t) of supplies had arrived by cruiser on 2 July. The reinforcements consolidated the defences of the former settlement at Barentsburg and made preparations for Gearbox II, another reinforcement of the Norwegians and part of the plan for Convoy PQ 18, to prevent a repeat of Convoy PQ 17 (27 June – 10 July 1942) in which 24 of the 35 freighters in the convoy had been sunk.

Force P (the Spitsbergen Fuelling Force) comprising the fleet oilers RFA Blue Ranger and RFA Oligarch and four destroyer escorts, sailed from Scapa Flow on 3 September and anchored in Lowe Sound (Van Mijenfjorden) several days later. From 9 to 13 September, relays of destroyers were detached from PQ 18 to refuel before the convoy passed Bjørnøya (Bear Island), into range of Luftwaffe bombers and torpedo-bombers based in north Norway.

After another German weather party was chased off the island by the Norwegians in June 1943, a German flotilla, including Tirpitz, raided Spitsbergen in Operation Zitronella on 7 September, took 31 prisoners and destroyed much of the infrastructure and equipment of Gearbox II. On 19 October, the cruiser USS Tuscaloosa and four destroyers delivered more Norwegian troops.

== Background ==
=== Svalbard ===
The Svalbard Archipelago is in the Arctic Ocean, 650 mi (1,050 km) from the North Pole. The islands are mountainous with permanently snow-covered peaks, some glaciated; there are occasional river terraces at the bottom of steep valleys and some coastal plains. In winter, the islands are covered in snow and the bays ice over. Spitsbergen Island has several large fiords along its west coast and Isfjorden is up to 10 mi (16 km) wide. The Gulf Stream warms the waters and the sea is ice-free during the summer. Settlements were established at Longyearbyen and Barentsburg in inlets along the south shore of Isfjorden, in Kings Bay (Quade Hock) further north along the coast and in Van Mijenfjorden (Lowe Sound) to the south. The settlements attracted colonists of different nationalities and the Svalbard Treaty of 1920 neutralised the islands and recognised the mineral and fishing rights of the participating countries. Before 1939, the population consisted of about 3,000, mostly Norwegian and Russian, people who worked in the mining industry. Drift mines were linked to the shore by overhead cable tracks or rails and coal dumped over the winter was collected by ship after the summer thaw. By 1939, production was about 500,000 long tons (510,000 t) a year, split between Norway and Russia.

=== Signals intelligence ===
The British Government Code and Cypher School (GC&CS) based at Bletchley Park housed a small industry of code-breakers and traffic analysts. By June 1941, the German Enigma machine Home Waters (Heimish) settings used by surface ships and U-boats could quickly be read. On 1 February 1942, the Enigma machines used in U-boats in the Atlantic and Mediterranean were changed but German ships and the U-boats in Arctic waters continued with the older Heimish (Hydra from 1942, Dolphin to the British). By mid-1941, British Y-stations were able to receive and read Luftwaffe W/T transmissions and give advance warning of Luftwaffe operations. In 1941, interception parties code-named headaches were embarked on warships and from May 1942, computers sailed with the cruiser admirals in command of convoy escorts, to read Luftwaffe W/T signals which could not be intercepted by stations in Britain. The Admiralty sent details of Luftwaffe wireless frequencies, call signs and the daily local codes to the computers. Combined with their knowledge of Luftwaffe procedures, the computers could give fairly accurate details of German reconnaissance sorties and sometimes predicted attacks twenty minutes before they were detected by radar. In February 1942, the German Beobachtungsdienst (B-Dienst, Observation Service) of the Kriegsmarine Marinenachrichtendienst (MND, Naval Intelligence Service) broke the British Naval Cypher No 3 and was able to read it until January 1943.

=== Naval operations, 1940–1942 ===
Topographic map of Svalbard

The Germans left the Svalbard islands alone during the invasion of Norway in 1940 and apart from a few Norwegians taking passage on Allied ships, little changed; wireless stations on the islands continued to broadcast weather reports in clear, which were useful to both sides. From 25 July to 9 August 1940, the cruiser Admiral Hipper sailed from Trondheim to search the area from Tromsø to Bear Island (Bjørnøya) and Svalbard, to intercept British ships returning from Petsamo but found only a Finnish freighter. On 12 July 1941, the Admiralty was ordered to assemble a force of ships to operate in the Arctic in co-operation with the USSR, despite objections from Admiral John (Jack) Tovey, commander of the Home Fleet, who preferred to operate further south, where there were more targets and better air cover.

Rear-admirals Philip Vian and Geoffrey Miles flew to Polyarnoe and Miles established a British military mission in Moscow. Vian reported that Murmansk was close to German-held territory, that its air defences were inadequate and that the prospects of offensive operations on German shipping were poor. Vian was sent to look at the west coast of Spitsbergen, the main island of Svalbard, which was mostly ice-free and 450 mi (720 km) from northern Norway, to assess its potential as a base. The cruisers HMS Nigeria, HMS Aurora and two destroyers departed Iceland on 27 July but Vian judged the apparent advantages of Spitsbergen as a base to be unsatisfactory. The force closed on the Norwegian coast twice and each time was discovered by Luftwaffe reconnaissance aircraft.

==== Operation Gauntlet ====
As Operation Dervish, the first Arctic convoy, was assembling in Iceland, Vian sailed with Force A for Svalbard on 19 August 1942 in Operation Gauntlet. Norwegian and Russian civilians were to be evacuated using the same two cruisers, with five destroyer escorts, an oiler and RMS Empress of Canada, a troop transport carrying 645 men, mainly Canadian infantry. (Note: Commander: Brigadier Arthur Potts, 527 Canadians, 25 Norwegians (Captain Aubert), 93 British including 57 Royal Engineers.) The expedition landed at Barentsburg to sabotage the coal industry, evacuate the Norwegian and Soviet civilians and commandeer any shipping that could be found. About 2,000 Russians were taken to Arkhangelsk in Empress of Canada, escorted by one of the cruisers and the three destroyers, which rendezvoused with the rest of Force A off Barentsburg on 1 September. Normal business was kept up at the Barentsburg wireless station by the Norwegian Military Governor Designate, Lieutenant Ragnvald Tamber; three colliers sent from the mainland were hijacked along with a seal ship MS Selis, the ice-breaker SS Isbjørn, a tug and two fishing boats. The Canadian landing parties re-embarked on 2 September and the force sailed for home on 3 September, with 800 Norwegian civilians and the prizes. The two cruisers diverted towards the Norwegian coast to hunt for German ships and early on 7 September, in stormy weather and poor visibility, found a German convoy off Porshanger near the North Cape. The cruisers sank the training ship Bremse but two troop transports, with 1,500 men aboard, escaped. Nigeria was damaged, thought to have hit a wreck but the naval force reached Scapa Flow on 10 September. (Note: After the war it was surmised that Nigeria had hit a mine.)

=== German bases, 1941–1942 ===
Location map, Longyearbyen in red

After Operation Gauntlet (25 August – 3 September 1941) the British had expected the Germans to occupy Svalbard as a base for attacks on Arctic convoys. The Germans were more interested in meteorological data, the Arctic being the origin of much of the weather over Western Europe. By August 1941, the Allies had eliminated German weather stations on Greenland, Jan Mayen Island, Bjørnøya and the civil weather reports from Spitsbergen. The Germans used weather reports from U-boats, reconnaissance aircraft, trawlers and other ships but these were too vulnerable to attack. The Kriegsmarine and the Luftwaffe surveyed land sites for weather stations in the range of sea and air supply, some to be manned and others automatic. Wettererkundungsstaffel 5 (Wekusta 5) part of Luftflotte 5, was based at Banak in northern Norway, once it was ready. The He 111s and Ju 88s of Wekusta 5 ranged over the Arctic Ocean, past Spitsbergen and Jan Mayen, towards Greenland; the experience gained made the unit capable of transporting and supplying manned and automatic weather stations.

After the wireless on Spitsbergen had mysteriously ceased transmission in early September, German reconnaissance flights from Banak discovered the Canadian demolitions, burning coal dumps and saw one man, a conscientious objector who had refused to leave, waving to them. Dr Erich Etienne, a former Polar explorer, commanded an operation to install a manned station on the islands but with winter imminent, time was short. Advent Bay (Adventfjorden) was chosen for its broad valley, making a safer approach for aircraft; its subsoil of alluvial gravel was acceptable for a landing ground. The south-eastern orientation of the high ground did not impede wireless communication with Banak and the settlement of Longyearbyen (Longyear Town) was close by. A north-west to south-east airstrip about 1,800 by 250 yd (1,650 by 230 m) was marked out, which was firm when dry and hard when frozen but liable to become boggy after rain and the spring thaw. The Germans used the Hans Lund Hut as a control room and wireless station, the Inner Hjorthamn Hut to the south-east being prepared as a substitute. The site received the code-name Bansö (from Banak and Spitsbergen Öya) and ferry flights of men, equipment and supplies began on 25 September. He 111, Ju 88 and Ju 52 pilots gained experience of landing on soft ground, cut with ruts and boulders.

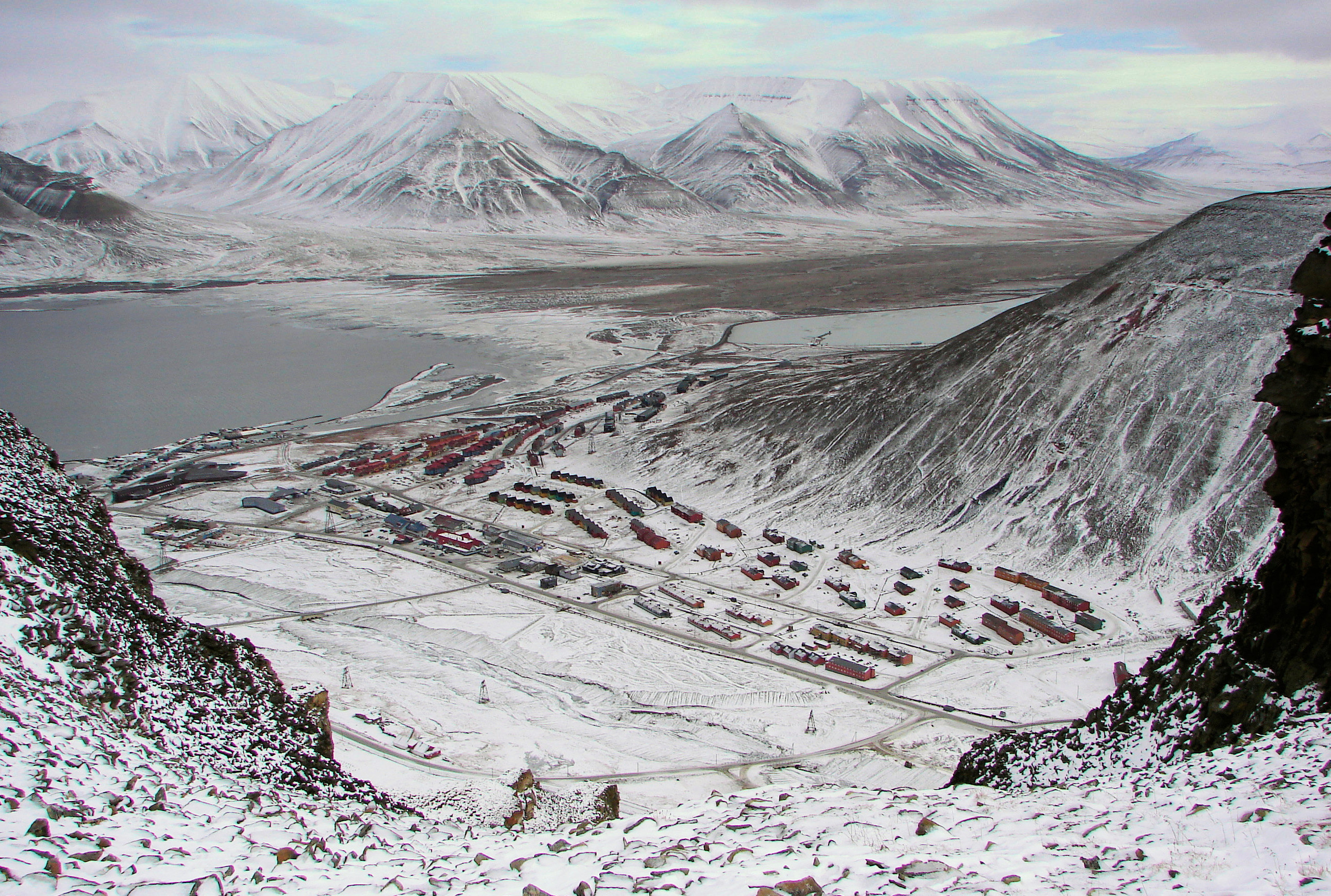
View of Longyearbyen, Adventsfjorden and Adventdalen (2006)

The British followed events from Bletchley Park through Ultra, made easier by German willingness to make routine use of radio communication. Four British minesweepers en route from Arkhangelsk were diverted to investigate and reached Isfjorden on 19 October. A Wekusta 5 aircraft crew spotted the ships as they prepared to land and the thirty men at Bansö were flown to safety by the aircraft and two Ju 52 transport aircraft in something of a rush. Bansö was deserted when the British arrived but some code books were recovered; when the ships left, the Germans returned. After 38 supply flights, Dr Albrecht Moll and three men arrived, to sen weather reports over the winter of 1941–1942. On 29 October 1941, Hans Knoespel and five weathermen were installed by the Kriegsmarine at Lilliehöökfjorden, a branch of Krossfjord in the north-western Spitsbergen. (Note: On 24 August 1942, the Knoespel group was repatriated by U-435, after being attacked by a party from Operation Gearbox.) Landing aircraft was riskier in winter, when the landing ground or an ice-covered bay was frozen solid, because soft snow on top could pile up in front of the wheels of the aircraft and jerk it to a stop or prevent it from reaching take-off speed when departing. The blanket of snow could also cover holes, into which a wheel could fall, potentially to damage the undercarriage or propeller.

The Moll party at Bansö called for aircraft when the weather was adequate and after making low and slow passes, to check the landing ground for obstructions, the pilot decided whether to land. On 2 May 1942, the apparatus for an automatic weather station, a thermometer, barometer, transmitter and batteries arrived at Banak, in a box nicknamed Kröte (toad) by the aircrew. As soon as weather permitted, it was to be flown to Bansö and the Moll party brought back. It took until 12 May for a favourable weather report to reach Banak and a He 111 and a Ju 88 were sent with supplies and the technicians to install the Kröte. The aircraft reached Bansö at 5:45 a.m. and after a careful examination of the ground, the Heinkel pilot eventually landed, keeping its tail well up out of the snow. The main wheels quickly accumulated a drift of packed snow in front of them and the aircraft almost nosed over. The ten crew and passengers joined the ground party, who welcomed them having been alone for six months; the Ju 88 pilot was warned off by a flare and returned to Banak.

=== Operation Fritham ===
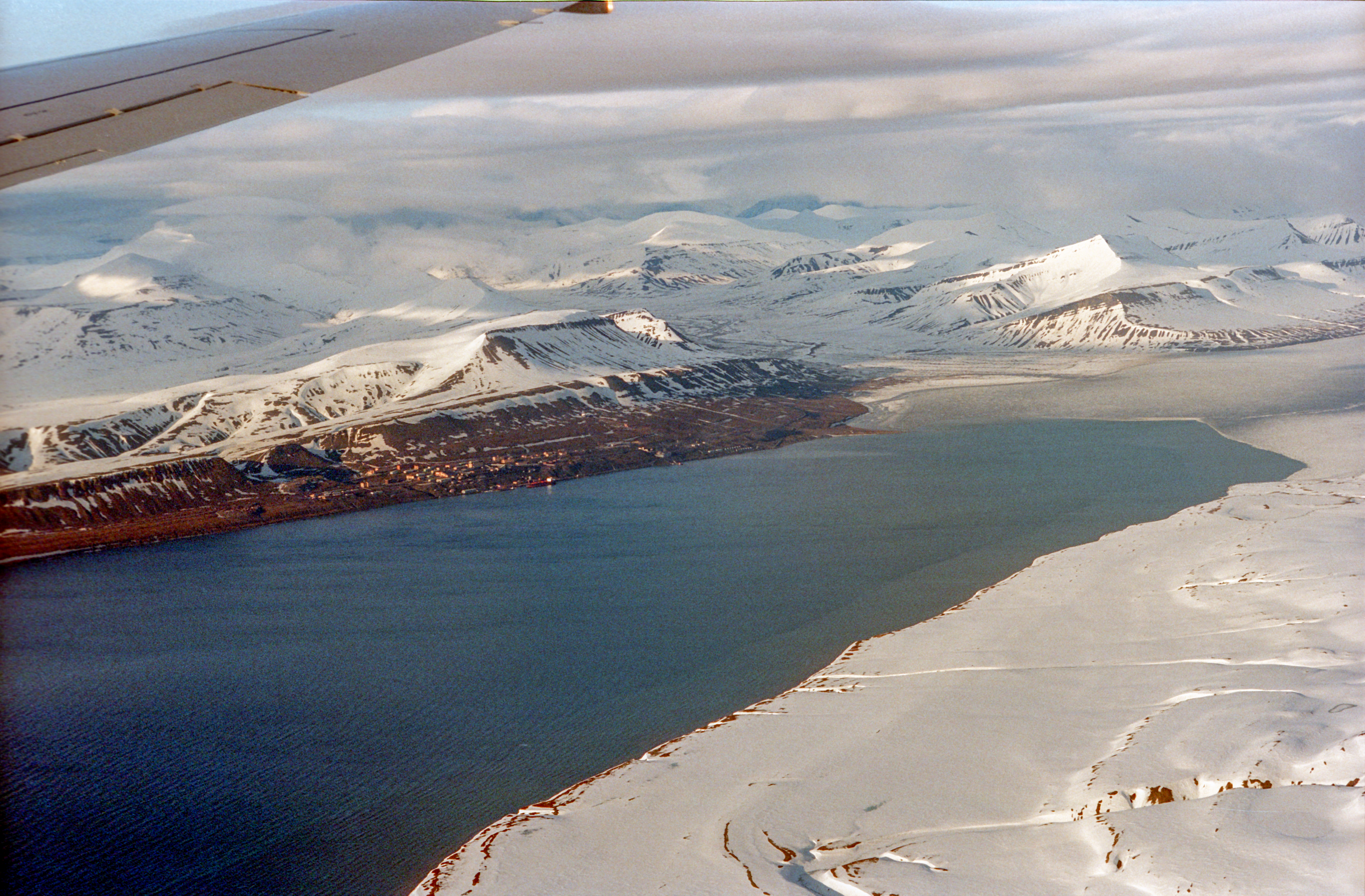
Barentsburg, on the east shore of Grønfjorden (Green Harbour) photographed from the north-west in 2003

On 30 April 1942, Isbjørn and Selis (Lieutenant H. Øi Royal Norwegian Navy) and about twenty crewmen sailed from Greenock with a Norwegian landing party of 60 men, accompanied by three British liaison officers. Each ship carried a 20 mm Oerlikon anti-aircraft gun but none of the party had been trained in their use. Major Amherst Whatman, a Polar explorer and signals specialist, repaired and operated the wireless set but it broke down on the journey to Iceland and was not reliable for the rest of the voyage. The ships hugged the Polar ice, with little risk of being seen by Luftwaffe aircraft, once north-east of Jan Mayen. The ships reached Svalbard on 13 May and entered Isfjorden at 8:00 p.m. Grønfjorden (Green Fjord or Green Harbour to the British) was covered in ice up to 4 ft (1.2 m) thick. The ice breaking was delayed until after midnight on 14 May and parties were sent to scout Barentsburg on the east shore and the Finneset peninsula. The scouting parties found no-one but took until 5:00 p.m. to get back, by when Isbjørn had cut a long channel in the ice but was still well short of Finneset. A Ju 88 flew along Isfiorden, also at 5:00 p.m. but Sverdrup insisted on making for the landing stage at Barentsburg to unload quicker.

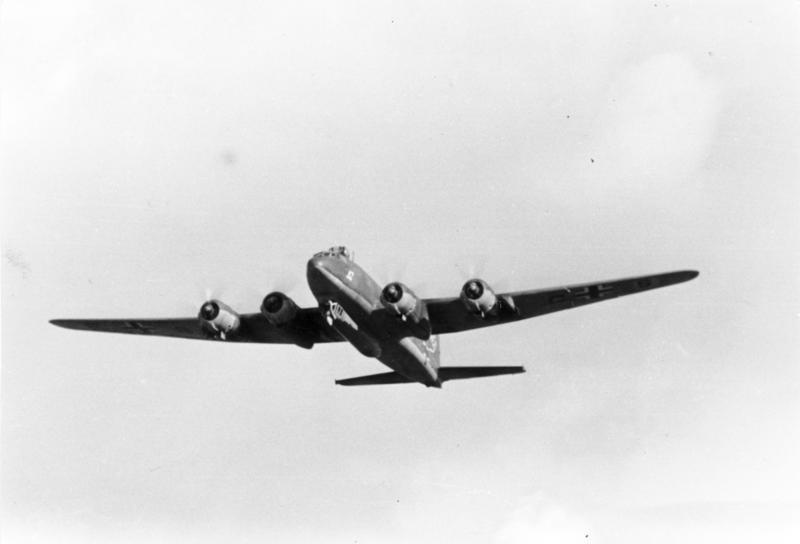
A Focke-Wulf Fw 200 Condor of the type that sank D/S Isbjørn and MS Selis.

At 8:30 p.m., four FW 200 Condor long-range reconnaissance bombers appeared; the valley sides were so high that the bombers arrived without warning and the third bomber hit Isbjørn which sank immediately; Selis was soon set on fire. Thirteen men were killed, including Sverdrup and Godfrey, nine men were wounded, two mortally. The equipment in Isbjørn, arms, ammunition, food, clothes and the wireless was lost. Barentsburg was only a few hundred yards across the ice and plenty of food was found because it was the Svalbard custom to stock up before winter. The local swine herd has been slaughtered during Gauntlet and the arctic cold had preserved the meat; wild duck could be plundered for eggs and an infirmary was also found, still stocked with dressings for the wounded. Ju 88 and He 111 bombers returned on 15 May but the survivors took cover in mine shafts. The fitter men at Barentsburg tended the wounded and lay low when the Luftwaffe was around. Lieutenant Ove Roll Lund sent parties south to Sveagruva (Swedish Mine) in Van Mijenfjord and to reconnoitre the Germans in Advent Bay around the airstrip at Bansö.

== Prelude ==
=== Luftwaffe, 14 June – 3 July 1942 ===
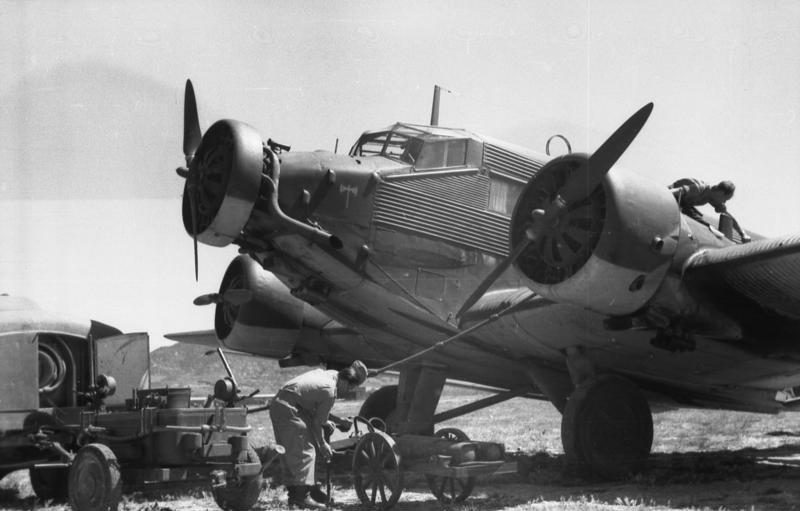
Example of a Ju 52 transport aircraft

The Germans at Bansö had reported the British flight of 26 May and on 12 June, reported that the landing ground was dry enough for a landing attempt. A Ju 88 flew to the island and landed but damaged its propellers as it taxied, the crew increasing the German party to 18 men. Luftwaffe aircraft were flown to Spitsbergen each day but were warned off by red flares fired by the ground party, until 26 June. The flight next day was also sent back and the Germans thought about using floatplanes but the east end of Isfjorden and Advent Bay were too full of drifting ice. In the midnight sun (20 April – 22 August) as mid-summer approached, the ice further west, near the Allied positions, cleared faster than at the German (eastern) end of the fiord.

The Germans reported the Catalina attack on the Ju 88 on 27 June, which left it a write-off and claimed to have damaged the British aircraft with return fire. On 30 June, the party sent a message that the airstrip was dry enough for Junkers Ju 52 aircraft and supply flights resumed. The aircraft were watched by a Norwegian party which had gone on an abortive expedition to destroy the German wireless at the Hans Lund Hut in Advent Bay. On clear days the German pilots flew direct over the mountains and on cloudy and misty days, when heavily laden, took the coast route past Barentsburg. A Kröte was installed on the north side of Advent Bay at Hjorthamn.

=== Operation Gearbox ===
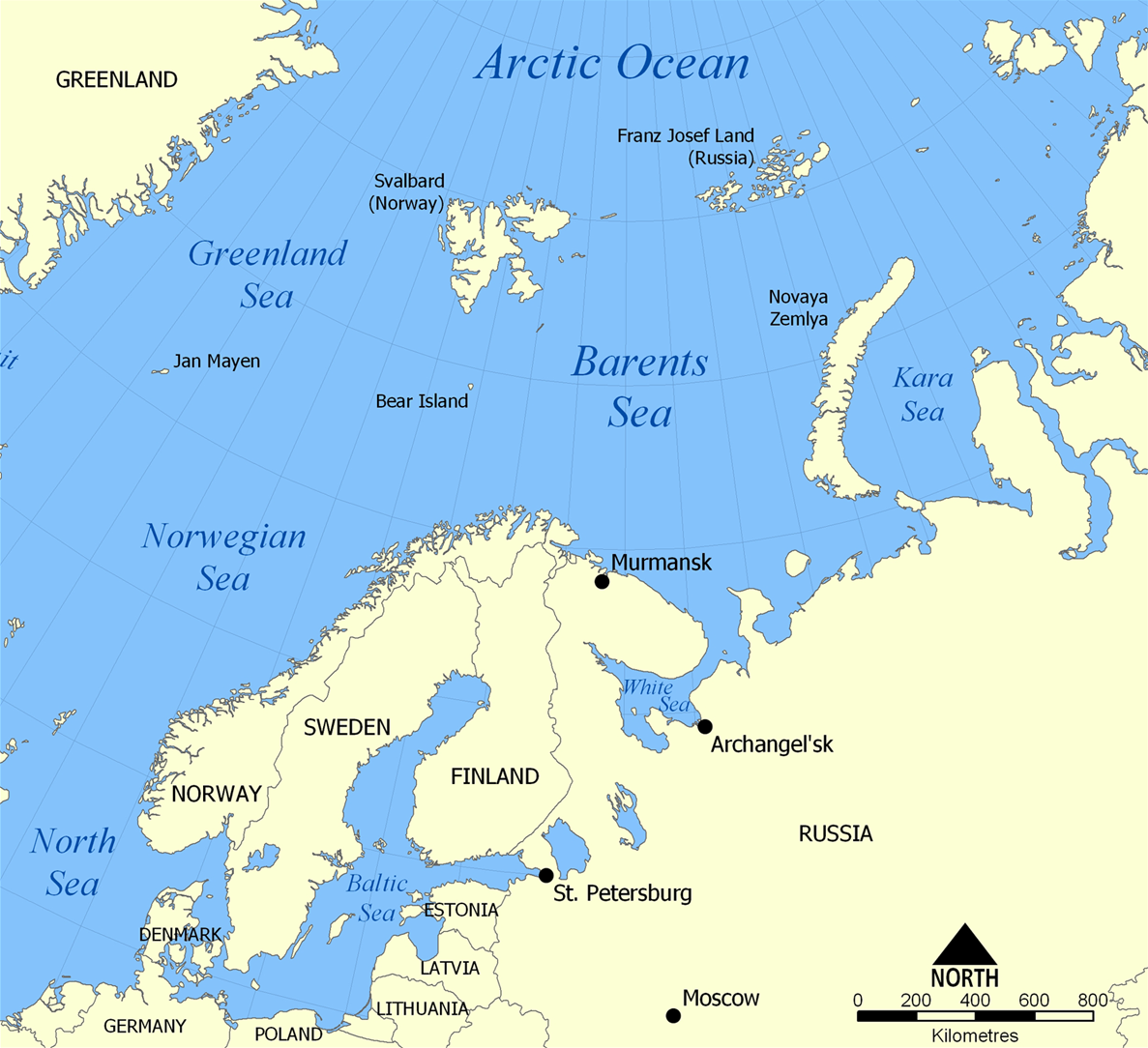
Map of the Barents Sea

The remainder of Fritham Force at Barentsburg was consolidated by the reinforcements of Operation Gearbox and its sequels, a weather station was set up and wireless contact with the Admiralty regained. Ullring reported the oversight with the Colt machine-guns, arranged for Catalina supply flights, provided weather and sighting reports, protected Whatman and his apparatus for research into the ionosphere and prepared to attack German weather stations wherever they could be found. Once Gearbox began, the personnel on Spitzbegen could do more than subsist and dodge attacks by German aircraft. Catalina N-Nuts flew to Spitsbergen on 13 July with the Colt parts and other supplies, thence to north Russia to search for PQ 17 survivors. The Catalina crew informed the British naval authorities in Murmansk that the Barents Sea was free of ice. Many survivors, including about forty men seen on the flight to north Russia, were rescued and ships reported sheltering at Novaya Zemlya were escorted safely to port.

The survivors of Operation Fritham provided excellent local knowledge and once the Colt parts had been delivered, Ullring had one mounted in a cutter. On 15 July, Ullring set off in the midnight sun with ten men to attack the Germans at Longyearbyen in Advent Bay. The party found that the last Germans on Spitsbergen, including the weather-reporting party resident since late 1941, had flown back to Norway on 9 July. The Germans had gone but the Ju 88 shot up on 1 July was still there, the wireless transmitter and other equipment were operational, stores were plentiful and the buildings used by the party were in good condition, suggesting that the German departure was not intended to be permanent. The Kröte near the shore at Hjorthamn was found, dismantled and returned to Barentsburg for shipment to Britain. At the beginning of August, Ullring took a party of nine men north along the coast and to Kongsfjorden (Kingsfjord) in the cutter to look for another German weather station but found only a footprint. On 20 August, a U-boat entered Isfjorden and bombarded shore installations in Green Harbour and Advent Bay, with its deck gun. At Barentsburg, the Norwegians returned fire from the cutter moored at the pier and with a 20 mm Oerlikon emplaced on the rise beyond the village, forcing the U-boat to fire from longer range; the Norwegians again suffered no casualties.

=== Plan ===
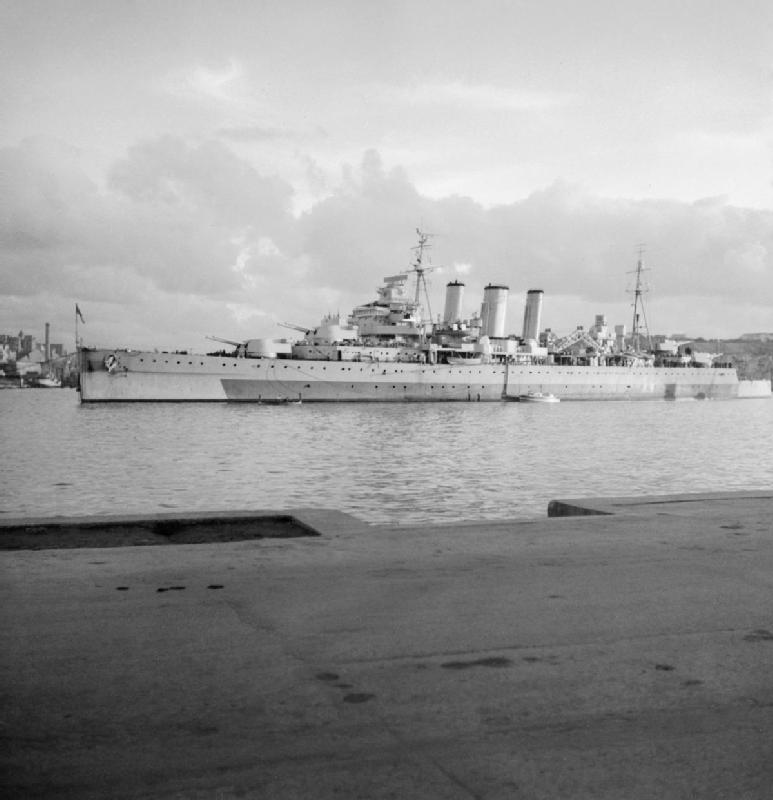
The County-class cruiser HMS Cumberland in 1946

After an abortive attempt to reach Spitsbergen on 26 July, Catalina P-Peter took off at 9:00 a.m. on 29 July, with Tetanus anti-toxin and other items for Operation Gearbox. Glen and some of the German equipment were picked up from Barentsburg and flown back to Sullom Voe though thick fog but with breaks in the high cloud enabling the crew to take astro shots; a new Air Position Indicator was also used. Glen was satisfied with the Norwegian control of Isfjorden and Green Harbour and that the area was suitable for use as a seaplane base. Glen was flown from Sullom Voe to Southampton on the south coast by Catalina to visit the Admiralty for discussions about the forthcoming Convoy PQ 18.

To avoid another disaster like PQ 17, the Admiralty was planning to provide far more support for PQ 18, which included the party on Spitsbergen. Glen was to be the British liaison officer with the Norwegians and Operation Gearbox II was to begin by using the convoy as cover. Bonham-Carter with the cruisers HMS Cumberland and HMS Sheffield escorted by HMS Eclipse and four more destroyers, was to carry the Gearbox II party and about 200 long tons (200 t) of stores. The delivery included forty Husky sled dogs, three Bofors 40 mm anti-aircraft guns, two tractors, boats, more wireless equipment, including direction finding apparatus and supplies for the winter.

After the calamity of PQ 17, The chief of RAF Coastal Command, Philip Joubert, revived a proposal to base a force of torpedo-bombers in north Russia, which took place as Operation Orator. Two Hampden torpedo-bomber squadrons, a detachment of ten Catalinas from 210 Squadron and four very-long-range Spitfire reconnaissance aircraft made the long and risky flight from Scotland to north Russia in early September and formed the Search & Strike Wing. Force P, the fleet oilers RFA Blue Ranger and RFA Oligarch escorted by four destroyers was to sail for Spitsbergen on 3 September and anchor in Lowe Sound, (Van Mijenfjorden), as a temporary, advanced refuelling base.

== Operation Gearbox II ==
=== September 1942 – 7 June 1943 ===
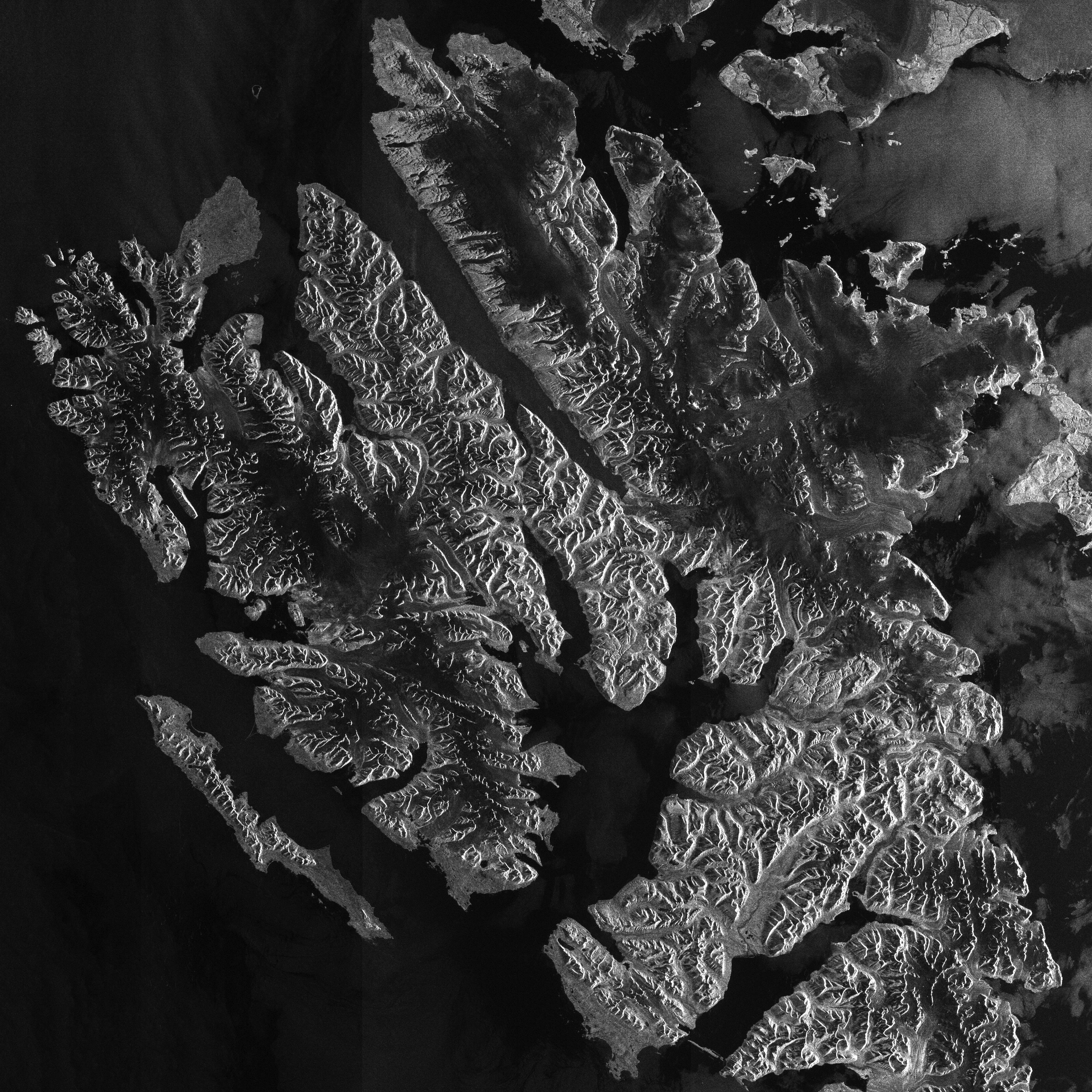
Radar photograph; bottom right shows Akseløya and Mariaholmen islands in Bellsund and Van Mijenfjorden beyond (Envisat, 2011)

Cumberland. Eclipse and four more destroyers arrived on 17 September, with 130 long tons (130 t) of supplies and a party of Norwegian troops (Lieutenant-Colonel Albert Tornerud, also the successor of Ullring as Military Governor). The heavier items were moved ashore on a raft made from 50 imp gal (230 L; 60 US gal) oil drums. Ullring went on board Cumberland to report on the last six weeks of operations. Sheffield arrived on 18 September with another 110 long tons (110 t) of stores. When Ullring reported to Captain A. W. Clarke on Sheffield, Clarke donated two depth charges to Gearbox and included in his report that Ullring had "...attacked a U-boat from a rowing boat armed with a tin opener". The ships repeated the practice of keeping their engines running and the crews closed up for anti-aircraft action; the cruisers managed to unload and depart in six hours. Glen began to prepare the local aspects of Gearbox II and Ullring relinquished command to Tornerud; Whatman remained the British Liaison Officer and stayed over the winter of 1942–1943, before being relieved.

The short range of some of the escorting destroyers involved in PQ 18, led to the dispatch of the Spitsbergen Fuelling Force (Force P), the fleet oilers Blue Ranger and Oligarch and four destroyer escorts. The ships sailed with PQ 18 on 3 September and turned north for Spitsbergen on 9 September to form a temporary advanced refuelling base in the 52 mi (84 km)-long Van Mijenfjorden (Lowe Sound). The fiord is separated from Bellsund by the islands of Akseløya and Mariaholmen. Sveagruva, on the north bank was still garrisoned by a party of the original Fritham Force, which had been rearmed during a visit from Ullring and Gearbox II in July. On 11 September, the cruiser HMS Scylla led five destroyers of the 3rd Destroyer Flotilla from PQ 18 arriving at Bellsund on the evening of 12 September; the ships sailed past the destroyer HMS Windsor acting as guard ship, to rendezvous with the two oilers and their four destroyer escorts in Axelfiord, to fuel before the most dangerous part of the convoy route, east of Bjørnøya. The flotilla departed at 4:00 a.m. on 13 September, reaching the convoy at 2:30 p.m. The oilers and escorts left for home on 21 September.

Healy and P-Peter took part in Orator and left Grasnaya on 25 September for Svalbard, to pick up Glen and return to Scotland. Bad weather forced a return to Murmansk and at 1:29 p.m., about 70 nmi (130 km; 81 mi) out from the coast, a Ju 88 attacked the Catalina, passed towards the front of the Catalina and was hit. Return fire from the Ju 88 entered the cockpit of the Catalina and killed Healy. After the war, the surviving crew members found that a Ju 88 of 1 Staffel, Fernaufklärungsgeschwader 22 (Long-Range Reconnaissance Group 22) from Banak in north Norway, had crashed off Tamsöy Island that day, attributed to an engagement with a "Russian flying boat". On 19 October, HMS Argonaut and two destroyers delivered supplies to Svalbard and a Norwegian vessel made the voyage in November. The survivors of SS Chulmleigh were discovered by two Norwegian ski troops from Gearbox II on 2 January 1943. Barentsburg was only 12 mi (19 km) from the landfall of the survivors; only the captain and eight members of the crew survived to be repatriated to Thurso in Scotland on 15 June 1943. On 7 June 1943, the cruisers Cumberland, Bermuda and two destroyers sailed from Iceland covered by the Home Fleet, landing reinforcements and supplies for Gearbox II on 10 July.

=== German bases 1942–1943 ===
Nussbaum, another Kriegsmarine meteorological party, commanded by Dr Franz Nusser, departed Norway in U-377 to return to Svalbard and re-occupy the Knospe base at Signehamna that had spent the winter of 1941–1942 gathering weather data. Two journeys to Svalbard were made and Nussbaum became operational in November 1942. During the winter of 1942–1943, the station needed no air supply but in May, spare parts were needed for its motor and hydrogen generators. The supplies were dropped by a Fw 200 of KG 40 which flew from Vaernes on 6, 8 and 18 May, collecting weather data en route. On 20 June 1943, Nussbaum was surprised by a Norwegian commando patrol, commanded by Kaptein E. Ullring with Fenrik Augensen, which was surveying Kongs Fjord and Kross Fjord in a gunboat. Five of the six Germans escaped to the coast of the Mitra peninsula but Heinz Kohler, who was closer to the water, was killed by the Norwegians near Signehamna. The weather party had managed to send a distress call before they fled and U-302 (Kapitănleutnant Herbert Sickel), cruising off Svalbard, embarked the party on 22 June. The Nussbaum party had seen a Fw 200 overhead but had not been spotted. On 26 June, U-302 rendezvoused with U-625 (Kapitănleutnant Hans Benker) to transfer the party, which arrived at Narvik on 28 June.

=== Operation Zitronella ===
On 20 June 1943, another German weather reporting party had been forced off Spitsbergen by the Norwegians and evacuated to Norway by U-boat. The party reported that the Norwegians had their own weather station in Isfjorden and on 6 September 1943, Tirpitz, Scharnhorst and ten destroyers sailed from Altafjord in Unternehmen Zitronella (also Unternehmen Sizilien, Operation Sicily) and reached Spitsbergen undetected. On 7 September, supported by a shore bombardment, the only occasion that Tirpitz fired its main battery horizontally in anger, a battalion of infantry landed and captured the installations at Barentsburg; after destroying the coal depots and other facilities, the German force withdrew. Captain Morten Bredsdorff and 30 Norwegians were taken prisoner but the rest of the party escaped inland and hid until the coast was clear, then returned to clear up the damage. The Admiralty was alerted on 8 September and the Home Fleet sailed but returned once it was clear that the German squadron was out of reach. On 22 September, a Catalina delivered new wireless equipment to restore communications and on 19 October, USS Tuscaloosa, escorted by one US and three British destroyers, delivered more Norwegian troops to Barentsburg. Members of Gearbox II were picked up from various points on the islands and delivered to Iceland and Scotland. (Note: Tuscaloosa's war diarist claimed that the ship had gone the farthest north of any US ship during the war (78° 18' 30" N).)

== Aftermath ==
=== Analysis ===
After the disaster of Operation Fritham, the base at Barentsburg was consolidated by the reinforcements of Operation Gearbox. The arrival of more troops and equipment in Gearbox II, with Operation Orator, provided a measure of protection for Convoy PQ 18, which lost thirteen ships compared to the 24 sunk during PQ 17. The exceptionally large number of destroyer escorts was maintained by detaching relays (9–13 September) to refuel from the two fleet oilers anchored in Van Mijenfjorden (Lowe Sound) in southern Spitsbergen.

Operation Zitronella, 8 September 1943, was a successful raid but the re-establishment of a German base on Svalbard was out of the question, given Allied naval and air superiority. In 1956, the US naval official historian Samuel Eliot Morison called it "overstuffed"; the attack had been magnified by German propaganda, despite being an enterprise needing little more than a destroyer. More Norwegian troops were shipped to Spitsbergen and the base rebuilt; the Norwegian presence was maintained until the end of the war.

=== Operation FQ ===
The garrison on Spitzbergen island was relieved by a flotilla consisting of Tuscaloosa a New Orleans-class cruiser and the destroyers USS Fitch, HMS Onslaught, Oribi and Orwell. Distant cover was provided by the Home Fleet with HMS Anson, a King George V-class battleship, the aircraft carrier USS Ranger, the heavy cruiser HMS Norfolk, USS Corry, HMS Hardy, HMCS Huron, HMS Impulsive, HMCS Iroquois, HMS Janus and HMS Vigilant. The ships reached Spitzbergen on 19 October 1943 and during the operation, Onslaught attacked and rammed a U-boat. The ships returned to Scapa Flow after the operation.

== See also ==
- Operation Haudegen (9 September 1944 to 4 September 1945)
