= Birkelandodden =

Headland of Akseløya, Svalbard

Coordinates: 77.7462°N 14.5759°E

Birkelandodden is the northern point of the island Akseløya between Van Mijenfjorden and Bellsund at Spitsbergen, Svalbard. The point is named after Kristian Birkeland.

A light has been set up to help navigation through Akselsundet, the main entrance to Van Mijenfjorden.
