= Mariasundet =

Coordinates: 77.6777°N 14.8322°E

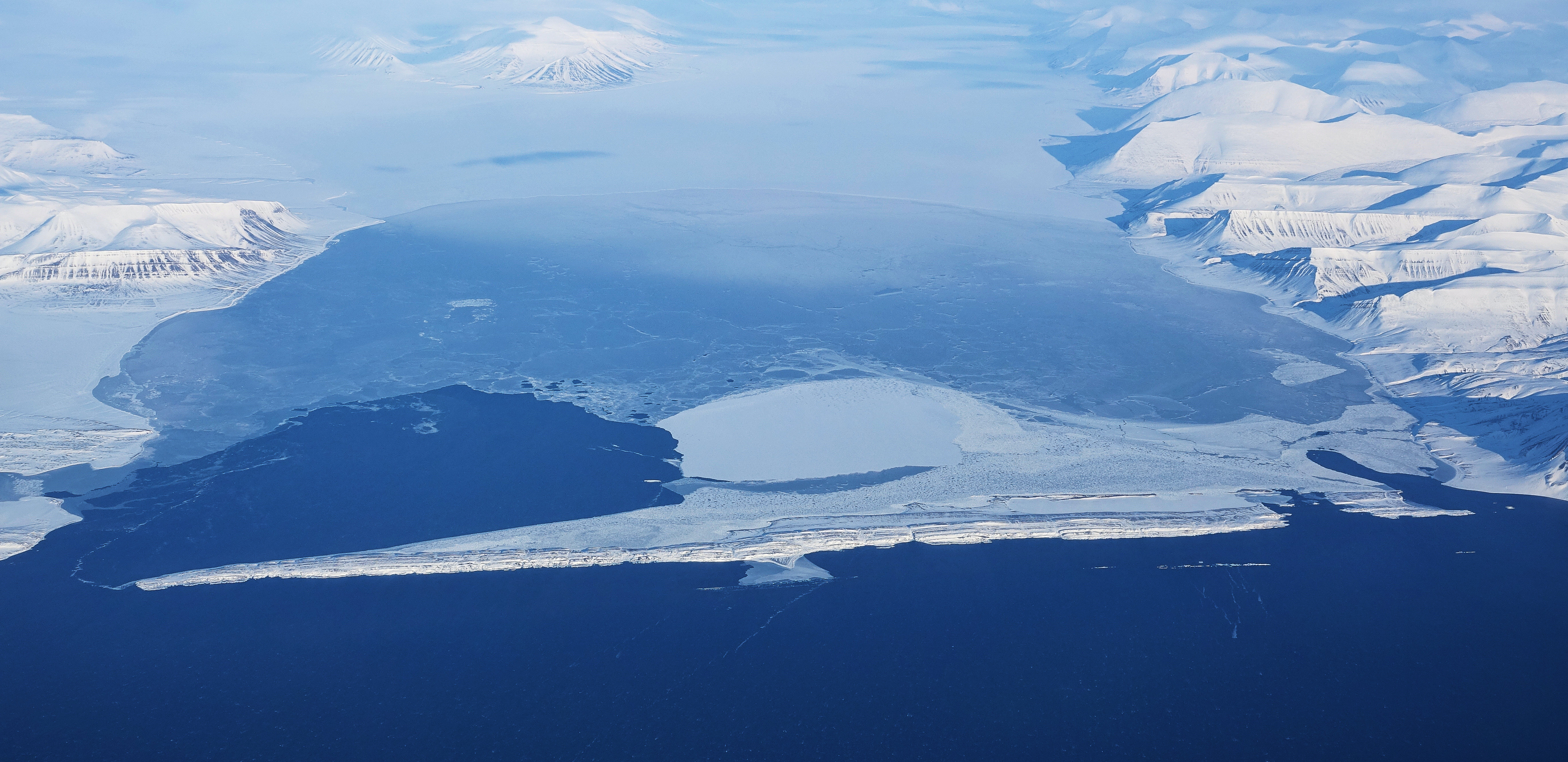
Van Mijenfjorden and Akseløya, with Mariaholmen and Mariasundet to the right.

Mariasundet is a sound in Nathorst Land at the mouth of Van Mijenfjorden at Spitsbergen, Svalbard; between Mariaholmen and Måseneset. While Akselsundet is regarded as the main entrance into Van Mijenfjorden, Mariasundet is also navigable. It contains the three sherries Svarten, Veslesvarten and Erta.
