= Gearbox (disambiguation) =

A gearbox is a component of a propulsion transmission providing multiple gear ratios.

Gearbox may also refer to:

- Gear train, a component of a transmission
- Gearbox Software, a video game company
- Gearbox Records, a recording company
- Operation Gearbox, a World War II military operation in 1942
- Operation Gearbox II, a World War II military operation, 1942–1943
