= Operation Zitronella =

1943 German raid on Svalbard during WW2

Coordinates: 78°54′N 18°01′E

- Part of the Arctic naval operations of World War II
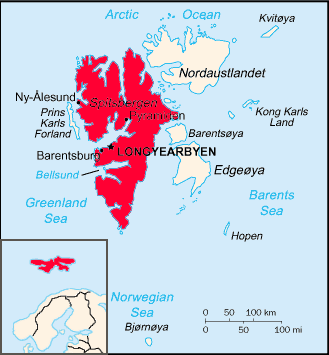
- Map of Svalbard with Spitsbergen in the west in red
Date	8 September 1943
Location	Spitsbergen in Svalbard, Norway
Result	German victory

Belligerents
Germany	Free Norway

Commanders and leaders
Friedrich Hüffmeier	Morten Bredsdorff (POW); Trond Astrup Vigtel †

Strength
2 battleships; 9 destroyers; 1 battalion fortress infantry	152 soldiers; 2 coastal guns; 2 AA guns

Casualties and losses
2 dead (one executed, one died of wounds); 15 wounded	6 killed; 31 (POW)

Operation Zitronella, also known as Unternehmen Sizilien (Operation Sicily), was an eight-hour German raid on Spitzbergen, in the Svalbard Archipelago, on 8 September 1943. The battleships Tirpitz (in its only offensive action) and Scharnhorst, plus nine destroyers, sailed to the archipelago, bombarded Allied-occupied settlements in Isfjorden and covered a landing party. Six Norwegians were killed and 31 were taken prisoner; sixteen Germans were wounded, one dying of his wounds.

== Background ==
=== Svalbard ===
The Svalbard Archipelago is in the Arctic Ocean, 650 mi (1,050 km) from the North Pole and a similar distance to Norway to the south. The islands are mountainous, with permanently snow-covered peaks, some glaciated; there are occasional river terraces at the bottom of steep valleys and some coastal plains. In winter, the islands are covered in snow and the bays ice over. To the west, Spitzbergen Island has several large fiords along its west coast; Isfjorden being up to 10 mi (16 km) wide. The Gulf Stream warms the waters and the sea is ice-free during the summer. In the 1940s, there were settlements at Longyearbyen (Longyear Town) and Barentsburg, in inlets along the south shore of Isfjorden, in Kings Bay (Quade Hock) further north along the coast and in Van Mijenfjorden to the south.

The settlements attracted colonists from many places; the treaty of 1920 neutralised the islands and recognised the mineral and fishing rights of the participating countries. Before 1939, the population consisted of about 3,000 people, mostly Norwegian and Soviet workers in the mining industry. Drift mines were linked to the shore by overhead cable tracks or rails and coal dumped over the winter was collected by ship after the summer thaw. By 1939 production was about 500,000 long tons (510,000 t) a year, split between Norway and the USSR.

=== Second World War ===
Topographic map of Svalbard (enlargeable)

During the Second World War, the Svalbard Archipelago was the scene of several military operations. In August 1941, British, Canadian and Free Norwegian Forces landed on Spitzbergen during Operation Gauntlet to destroy the coal industry, associated equipment and stores. No attempt was made to establish a garrison and the civilian population was evacuated. Germany set up manned meteorological stations in the Arctic to improve weather forecasts, vital for the warfare against Allied convoys from the UK to the USSR. Dr Erich Etienne, a former Polar explorer, commanded an operation to install a manned station on the islands. Advent Bay (Adventfjorden) was chosen for its broad valley, a safer approach and landing ground for aircraft. The subsoil of alluvial gravel was acceptable for an airstrip and the south-eastern orientation of the high ground did not impede wireless communication with Banak in Norway; the settlement of Longyearbyen was close by. The site received the code-name Bansö (from Banak and Spitzbergen Öya) and ferry flights of men, equipment and supplies began on 25 September.

The British followed events from Bletchley Park through Ultra, four British minesweepers were diverted to investigate and reached Isfjorden on 19 October. A Wettererkundungsstaffel Wekusta 5 aircraft crew spotted the ships and the thirty men at Adventfjorden quickly were flown to safety by the aircraft and two Junkers Ju 52 transport aircraft. Adventfjorden was deserted when the British arrived but some code books were recovered; the Germans returned once the ships had departed. Dr Albrecht Moll and three men arrived to spend the winter of 1941–1942 transmitting weather reports. On 29 October 1941, Hans Knoespel and five weathermen were installed by the Kriegsmarine at Signehamna, a small bay on Lilliehöökfjorden, a branch of Krossfjorden in north-western Spitzbergen. An automatic weather station (Kröte) with a thermometer, barometer, transmitter and batteries arrived at Banak, to be flown to Bansö and the Moll party to be brought back. It took until 12 May for favourable weather; a Heinkel He 111 and a Junkers Ju 88 were sent with supplies and the technicians to install the Kröte. In April 1942, Operation Fritham, the landing of a Norwegian force at Barentsburg to occupy the islands, met with disaster but by the summer of 1943, the later Allied Operation Gearbox and Operation Gearbox II secured Allied control of the islands.

== Prelude ==
=== Kriegsmarine ===
The Kriegsmarine decided to evacuate the Knospe weather station during the summer of 1942, since the ice-free season made it vulnerable to Allied attack. The submarine U-435 (Kapitänleutnant Siegfried Strelow) was ordered to recover the six men. On 23 August 1942, Strelow took aboard the party at Ebeltofthamna in Krossfjorden on the Mitra peninsula without Allied interference and arrived at Narvik on 31 August. After the replacement of Großadmiral (Grand Admiral) Erich Raeder by Karl Dönitz in January 1943, command arrangements in northern waters were changed. The posts of Flag Officer Northern Waters at Narvik was merged with Group North, which brought the commander of the German ships at Alte Fjord under the command of Generaladmiral Otto Schniewind at Kiel. Dönitz persuaded Hitler not to scrap the surface fleet and made plans to demonstrate the value of the ships and raise the morale of the crews.

=== German plans ===
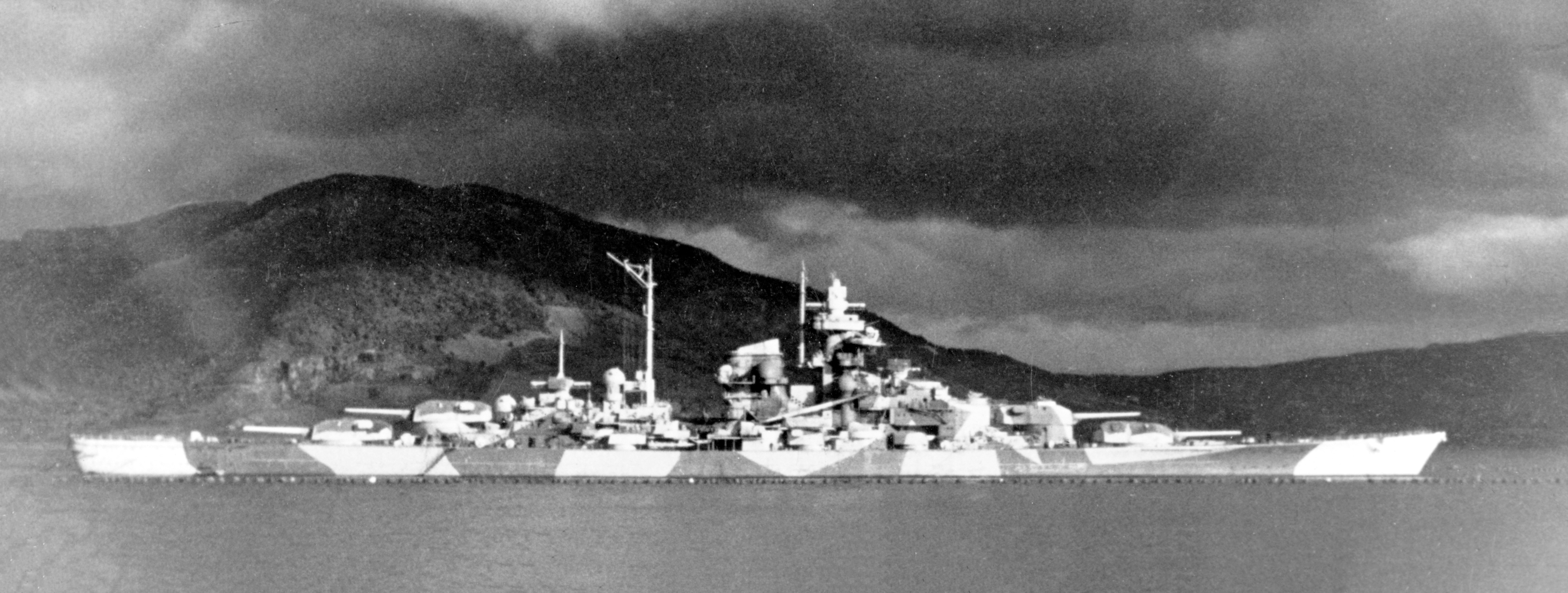
Tirpitz in Alte Fjord

The battleships Tirpitz (Kapitän zur See [KzS] Hans Karl Meyer) and Scharnhorst (KzS Friedrich Hüffmeier) and nine destroyers of the 4. Zerstörer-Flottille (KzS Rolf Johannesson), 5. Zerstörer-Flottille (KzS Max-Eckart Wolff) and 6. Zerstörer-Flottille (KzS Friedrich Kothe) with the Narvik-class destroyers Z27, Z29, Z30, Z31, Z33 and Z15 Erich Steinbrinck, Z20 Karl Galster, Z6 Theodor Riedel and Z10 Hans Lody, embarked a battalion of the 349th Grenadier Regiment, 230th Infantry Division. The ships sailed for Svalbard on 6 September. Tirpitz led Scharnhorst, with Karl Galster, Theodore Riedel and Hans Lody providing an anti-submarine screen ahead, Erich Steinbrinck, Z27 and Z30 to starboard and Z29, Z31 and Z33 to port, as the ships sailed past Stjernsundet. By 8:00 a.m. on 7 September, the force was halfway to Bear Island. During the evening a message was received that a British reconnaissance aircraft had flown over Alte Fjord at 4:45 p.m., when the ships were only 400 km (250 mi) from Svalbard, with the British fifty hours away, even at full speed.

== Action ==
At 3:00 a.m. on 8 September, Scharnhorst and the 5th and 6th Destroyer Flotillas landed troops in Advent bay, while Tirpitz and the 4th flotilla sailed to Barentsburg, Tirpitz flying a white ensign as a ruse. Just before the ships opened fire, a wireless message from Grønfjord was intercepted by the ships that three cruisers and seven destroyers had arrived; Tirpitz began to jam the frequency but could not tell if the message was blocked. At 4:00 a.m. a reply from Reykjavik suggested that the message had been received and Tirpitz silenced the transmitter with shells from its main armament. Supported by the gunfire of the eight 15-inch guns of Tirpitz at Barentsburg (fifty-two 15-inch and eighty-two 5.9-inch rounds) and the nine 11-inch guns of Scharnhorst at Longyearbyen, against the two 3-inch guns of the defenders, the destroyers landed the battalion of fortress troops. The Norwegian guns were put out of action and coal heaps, supplies of food, water and electricity generators were destroyed. When Z29, Z31 and Z33 manoeuvred into Grønfjorden, to land troops at Barentsburg, they sailed in front of Tirpitz and the gunners of the two Bofors 40 mm guns took advantage and fired about 150 rounds at the destroyers, which moved aside to give Tirpitz a clear field of fire. Z29 and Z33 were both damaged, with Z33 having to be taken in tow. A broadside of twelve shells silenced the Bofors guns. Tirpitz fired its main guns at a coalmine at Heerodden and set it on fire. A message from Z29 led Tirpitz to sail further into Grønfjorden, fire another twenty shells and at 5:00 a.m. Johannesson reported that the troops had landed as planned.

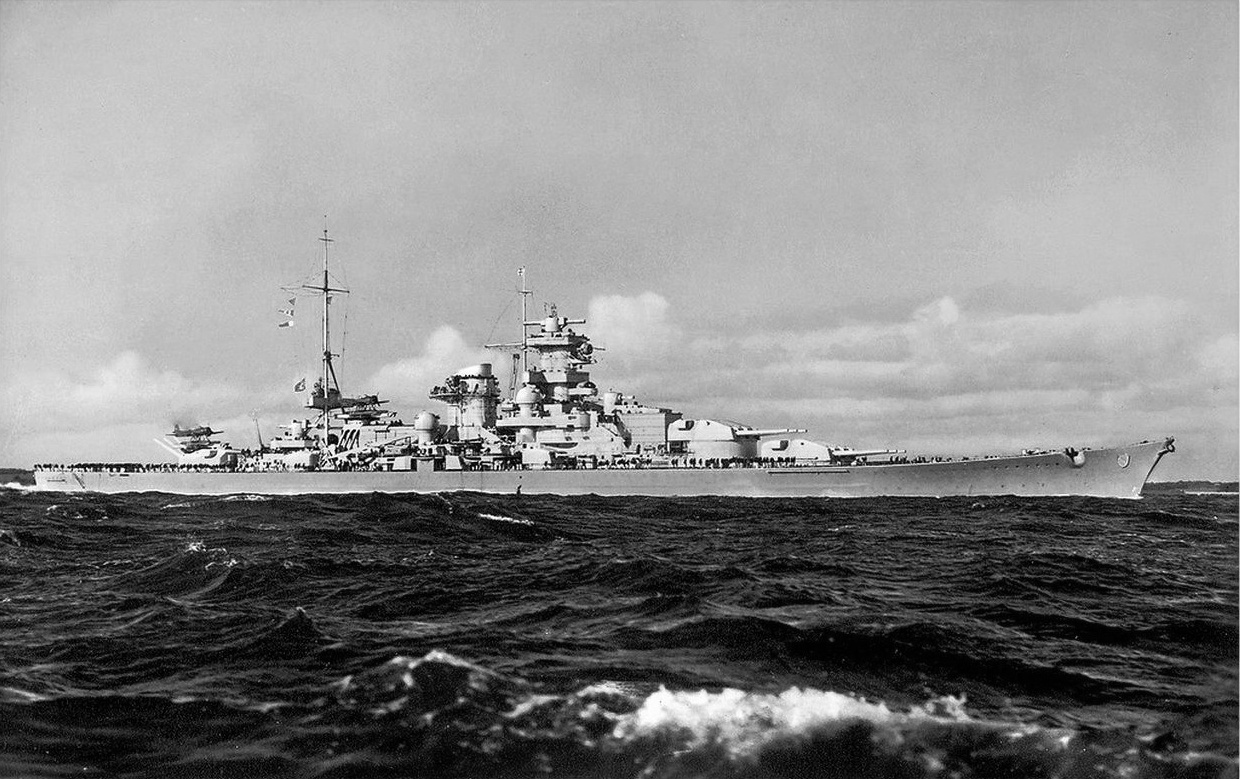
Scharnhorst photographed at sea

The surviving Norwegians fled into the hinterland, using a blazing coal dump for cover as the landing party seized the installations at Barentsburg. Kummetz was apprehensive about the wireless message sent by the Norwegians, in case the Home Fleet was already at sea and wanted the infantry back on board his ships by 11:00 a.m. Scharnhorst had sailed further into Isfjorden to Longyearbyen and reported by 5:12 a.m. that the Norwegians had been overrun. At 7:00 a.m., the infantry commander, Colonel Wendte, reported that the demolitions would be complete by 8:00 a.m. After a methodical bombardment, the German ships re-embarked the landing party and their prisoners by 11:00 a.m. The German ships put to sea, Tirpitz firing another eight shells at ammunition and fuel dumps outside Barentsburg. Recovering the last of the floatplanes caused a delay to Tirpitz until 12:00 p.m. and then the flotilla left at 19 kn (35 km/h; 22 mph) The Norwegians repaired their wireless and got off a sighting report, which led to the Home Fleet sailing from Scapa Flow but it was too late to intercept the German ships, which reached port on 9 September.

== Aftermath ==
=== Analysis ===
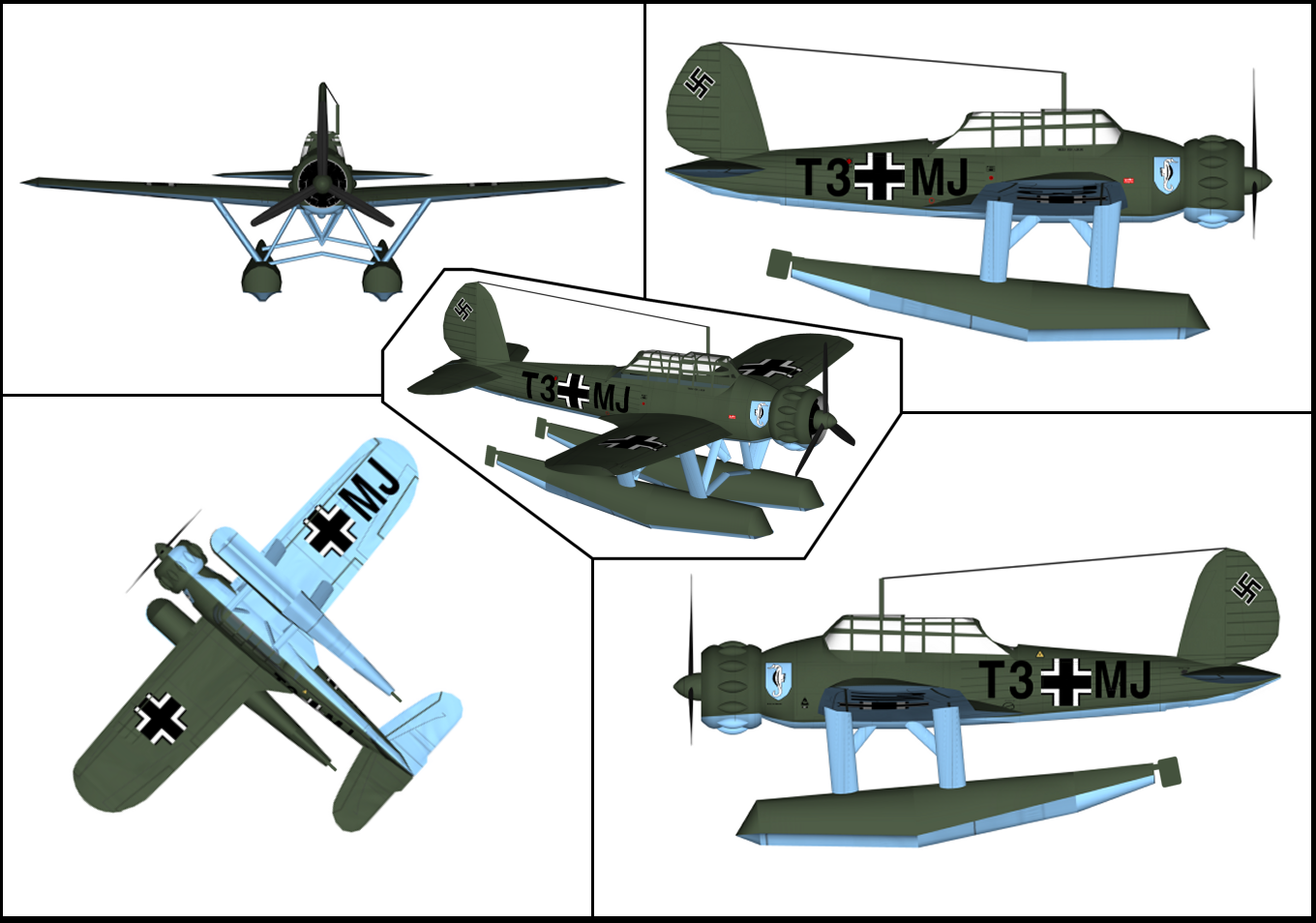
Drawing of an Arado Ar 196 of the type carried by Tirpitz

Unternehmen Zitronella/Sizilien was a qualified success; it brought no lasting benefit, since the Allies quickly re-occupied Spitzbergen island. On 19 October, the cruiser USS Tuscaloosa arrived at Barentsburg with relief and reinforcements for the Norwegian garrison. Samuel Eliot Morison, the official historian of the US Navy, described Zitronella as a political move on the part of the Kriegsmarine, to show Hitler that the German surface fleet had some value. Morison judged the effort disproportionate to the results, suggesting that the same ends could have been achieved more simply. In 2013, Niklas Zetterling and Michael Tamelander called the operation insignificant, apart from useful training for the crews.

=== Casualties ===
Sixteen German sailors were wounded, one dying of his wounds and six Norwegians were killed. Captain Morten Bredsdorff and thirty prisoners were sent to Oflag XXI-C in Schildberg (now Ostrzeszów) in the Reichsgau Wartheland in the former state of Poland, joining 1,089 Norwegian officers interned there. A German Leading Seaman from a destroyer was court-martialled and sentenced to death for cowardice (he had hidden on his ship rather than accompanying troops to the shore) and was executed on the quarterdeck of Scharnhorst. This episode, along with a dispute over medal allocation, when the crew of Scharnhorst received only 160 Iron Crosses against 400 for the crew of Tirpitz, exacerbated the bad relationship between the crews.

=== Subsequent operations ===
Under cover of the attack, the Luftwaffe installed a weather station on Hopen Island. (Isolated for months after the German surrender in May 1945, the airmen on Hopen Island gave themselves up in September 1945 to the captain of a Norwegian fishing boat.) A British–Soviet attack on Tirpitz and Scharnhorst in Altafjord was being prepared when the ships had sailed for Svalbard. A Catalina flying boat of 190 Squadron, based at Sullom Voe in the Shetland Isles, in Scotland, was ordered to reconnoitre Isfjorden and took off at 5:00 p.m. The crew was to fly to Svalbard, then south to a point off the Norwegian coast, turning east to make landfall at Murmansk. If the German ships were sighted, the Catalina crew were to shadow the ships until shot down or the prudent limit of endurance (PLE) was reached, flying to Grasnaya on the Kola Inlet. The Catalina was filled with fuel and left behind its depth charges.

The Catalina flew to Sørkapp, then navigated up the west coast to Isfjorden and searched for signs of life around Kapp Linné, Barenstburg, Green Harbour, Grumant and Longyearbyen, taking photographs and finding only destroyed buildings and smoke from the fires started by the Germans. (The aviators heard later that a survivor in the hills heard them and ran to the shore but was not seen.) The Catalina was flown towards Norway along the expected track of the German ships, assuming that they were making for Alta Fjord. Some oil was seen on the sea and a Ju 88 was spotted high up, flying the other way but no ships. The Catalina landed as planned and the crew were told the flight was in support of Operation Source, an X-Craft (midget submarine) attack against the ships; their reconnaissance photos were to be flown to Britain for briefing material.

== See also ==
- Arctic Ocean operations of World War II

== Bibliography ==
- French, J. (2013). Dyer, A. (ed.). Catalina over Arctic Oceans: Anti-submarine and Rescue Flying in World War II. Barnsley: Pen & Sword Aviation. ISBN 978-1-78159-053-9.
- Kington, J. A.; Selinger, F. (2006). Wekusta: Luftwaffe Meteorological Reconnaissance Units & Operations 1938–1945. Ottringham: Flight Recorder Publications. ISBN 978-0-9545605-8-4.
- Morison, S. E. (1956). The Atlantic Battle Won, May 1943 – May 1945. History of United States Naval Operations in World War II. Vol. X (online scan ed.). Boston, Massachusetts: Little, Brown and Co. OCLC 59074150.
- Roskill, S. W. (1960). Butler, J. R. M. (ed.). The War at Sea 1939–1945: The Offensive, Part I: 1st June 1943 – 31st May 1944. History of the Second World War, United Kingdom Military Series. Vol. III. London: HMSO. OCLC 570500225.
- Schiøtz, Eli (2007). Offiser og krigsfange: Norske offiserer i tysk krigsfangenskap – fra oberst Johannes Schiøtz' dagbok [Officer and Prisoner of War: Norwegian Officers in German War Captivity: From Colonel John Schiøtz's Diary] (in Norwegian) (1st ed.). Kjeller: Genesis forlag. ISBN 978-82-476-0336-9.
- Schofield, Ernest; Nesbit, Roy Conyers (2005). Arctic Airmen: The RAF in Spitsbergen and North Russia 1942 (2nd ed.). London: W. Kimber. ISBN 978-1-86227-291-0.
- Stacey, C. P. (2008) [1956]. Six Years of War: The Army in Canada, Britain and the Pacific. Official History of the Canadian Army in the Second World War. Vol. I (online scan, Dept. of National Defence, Directorate of History and Heritage ed.). Ottawa: Authority of the Minister of National Defence. OCLC 317352934. Archived from the original on 1 April 2019.
- Sweetman, J. (2004). Tirpitz: Hunting the Beast: Air Attacks on the German Battleship, 1940–44 (2nd pbk. ed.). Stroud: The History Press. ISBN 978-0-7509-3755-9.
- Umbreit, Andreas (2009). Spitsbergen, Svalbard, Franz Josef Land, & Jan Meyen (4th ed.). Chalfont St Peter: Bradt Travel Guides. ISBN 978-1-84162-240-8.
- Winton, J. (1984). The Death of the Scharnhorst. London: Panther Books. ISBN 0-586-06207-6.
- Woodman, Richard (2004) [1994]. Arctic Convoys 1941–1945. London: John Murray. ISBN 978-0-7195-5752-1.
- Woodward, D. (1953). The Tirpitz and the Battle for the North Atlantic. Berkley Books (G-64) (pbk. ed.). New York: Berkley Publishing Corp. OCLC 878500849.
- Zetterling, N.; Tamelander, M. (2013) [2011]. Tirpitz: The Life and Death of Germany's Last Super Battleship (pbk. repr. ed.). Philadelphia, PA: Casemante. ISBN 978-1-61200-198-2.
