= Hans Claessen =

Dutch merchant

Hans Claessen or Claesz (1562–1623) was an influential merchant from Amsterdam. He was a founding member and CEO of both the New Netherland Company and the Greenland Company. Claessen lived at the Keizersgracht 118-120 and is buried in the Nieuwe Kerk on the Dam Square

Claessen was involved in the fur trade and had commercial interests on the Bay of Biscay. He also shipped large quantities of wood from Sweden to Spain, as well as salt from Riga. His organisation, the Hans Claesz Compagnie, had a patent from the Staten Generaal to trade near the Hudson area. In August 1613 Hans Claessen had a meeting with Prince Maurits, which in 1614 eventually led to a merger of all the Amsterdam companies into the New Netherlands Company.

Hans Claessen had one daughter, Susanna Claessen (1599). She married the mayor of the Hague Abraham Le Fever (1585-1655) who was also one of the leaders of the contra-remonstrants. They are among the ancestors of many families in both the former New Netherlands colonies and the Caribbean, and of North-American Huguenot descendants.
