= Kapp Muyen =

Coordinates: 71°5.1′N 8°23.1′W

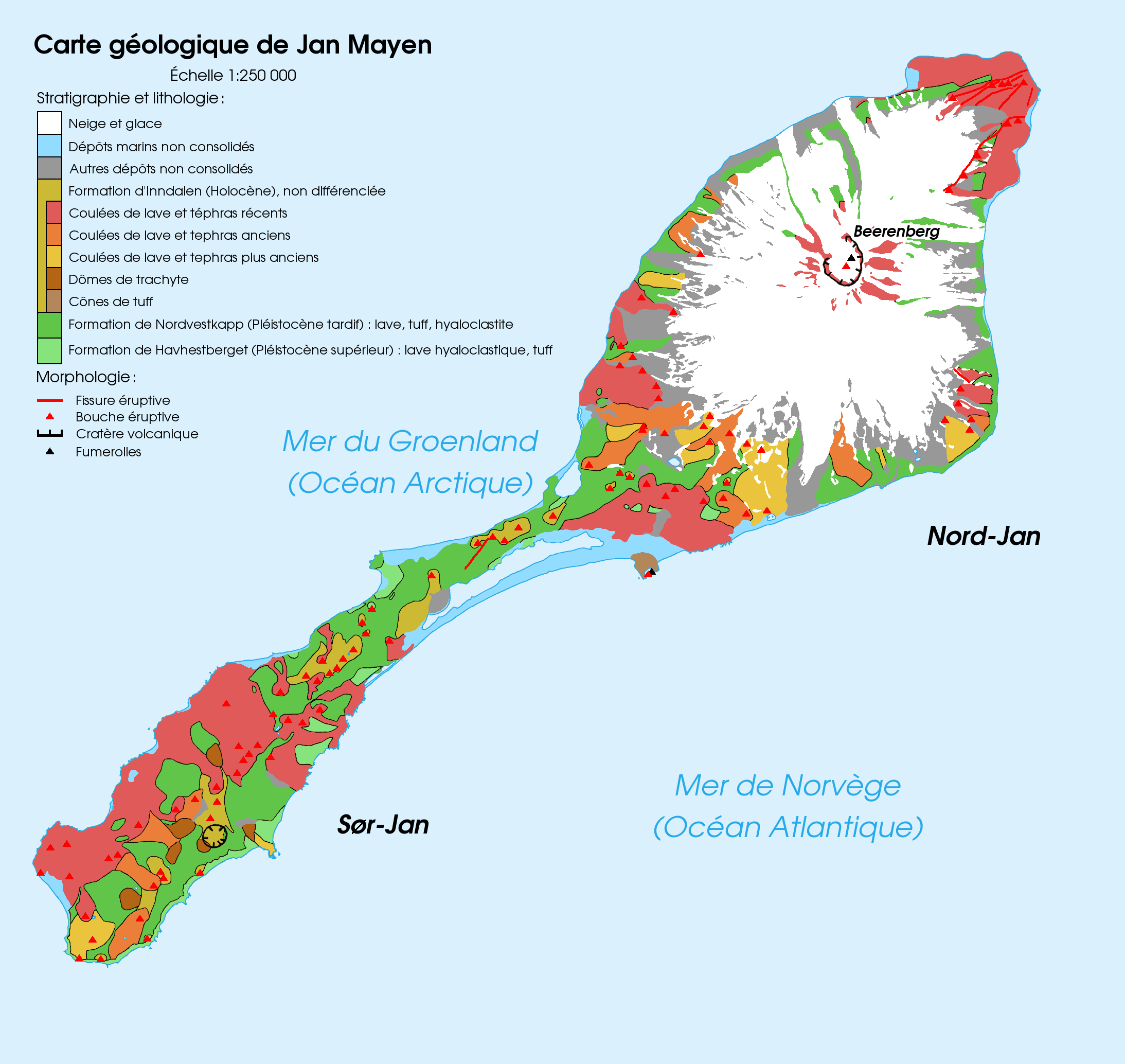
Map of Jan Mayen

Kapp Muyen (English: Cape Muyden) is a cape just 107 m (350 ft) west of Beerenberg, the stratovolcano which forms the northeastern end of the Norwegian island of Jan Mayen. The point is named after the Dutch whaling master Willem Cornelisz. van Muyden, who was among the first to catch whales at Jan Mayen.
