= Lambert van Tweenhuysen =

Lambert van Tweenhuysen (1564 in Zwolle – 1625 in Amsterdam) was a prominent Lutheran merchant at Amsterdam in the early seventeenth century. Born of a well-known patrician family, he had contacts ranging from Archangel and Spitsbergen to North America, and from Northwest Africa to Istanbul. He traded in a wide variety of items, including salt, corn, wine, wood, linseed, textiles, tar, soap, furs, spices, and pearls. He had trade connections in the Baltic, France, Spain, Portugal and the Mediterranean.

In 1612 Van Tweenhuysen was the investor/administrator of a company in Amsterdam that sent the first Dutch walrus-hunting expedition to Spitsbergen under the command of Willem Cornelisz. van Muyden. The following year he again sent Van Muyden to Spitsbergen, this time on a whaling expedition. In 1614 he was among the founders of both the New Netherland Company (Nieuw-Nederland Compagnie) and the Northern Company (Noordsche Compagnie). The former was created to monopolize trade with Native Americans in the newly formed Dutch colony of the same name; while the latter was formed to monopolize whaling in the Arctic, in particular at Spitsbergen (Svalbard). For years Van Tweenhuysen collaborated with Samuel Godijn, both pioneers.
