= Mariaholmen =

Island in Svalbard, Norway

Coordinates: 77.6818°N 14.8102°E

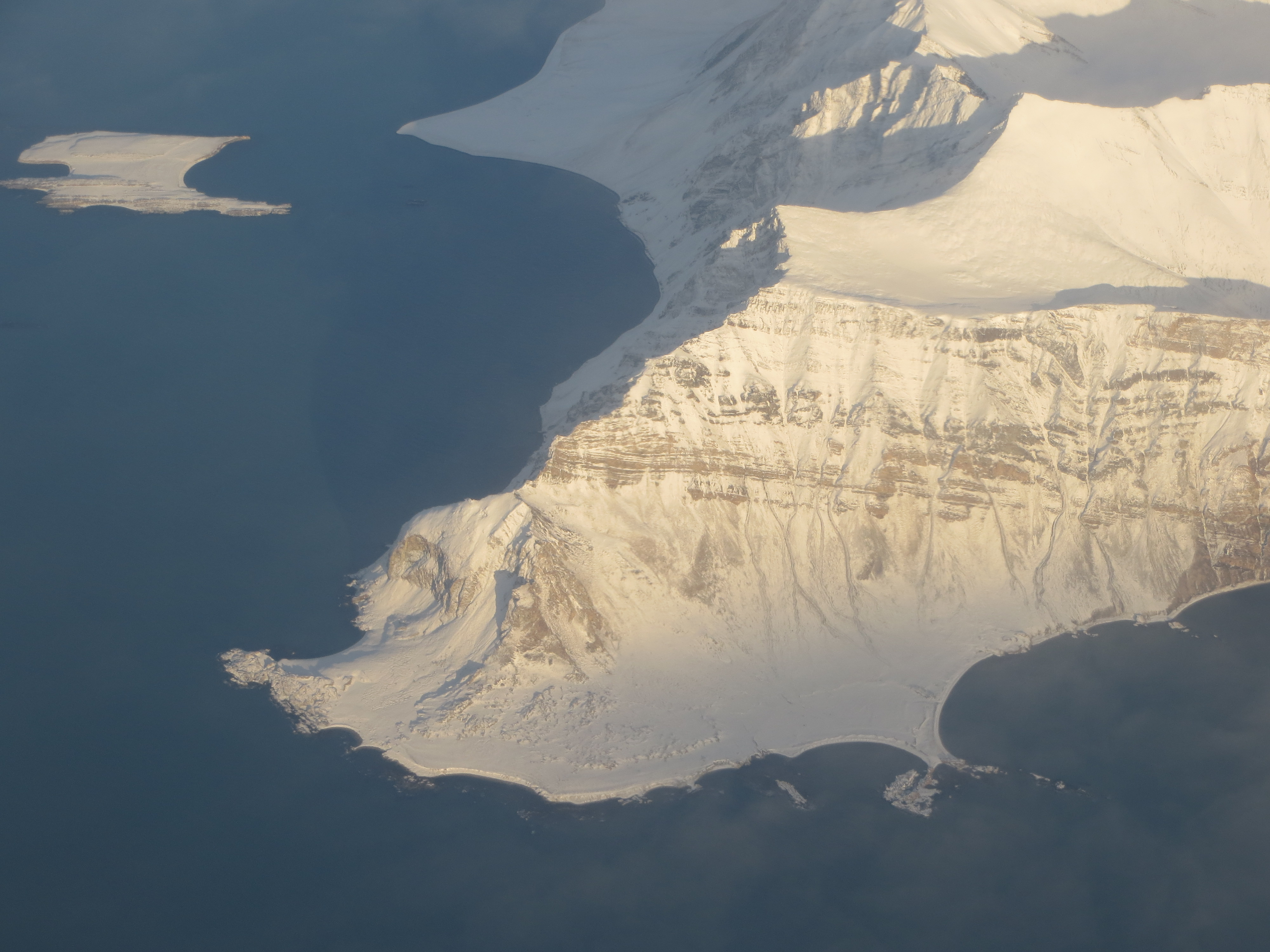
Mariaholmen on the left side of the oblique aerial photograph, off Gåsbergodden , the western tip of Nathorst Land.

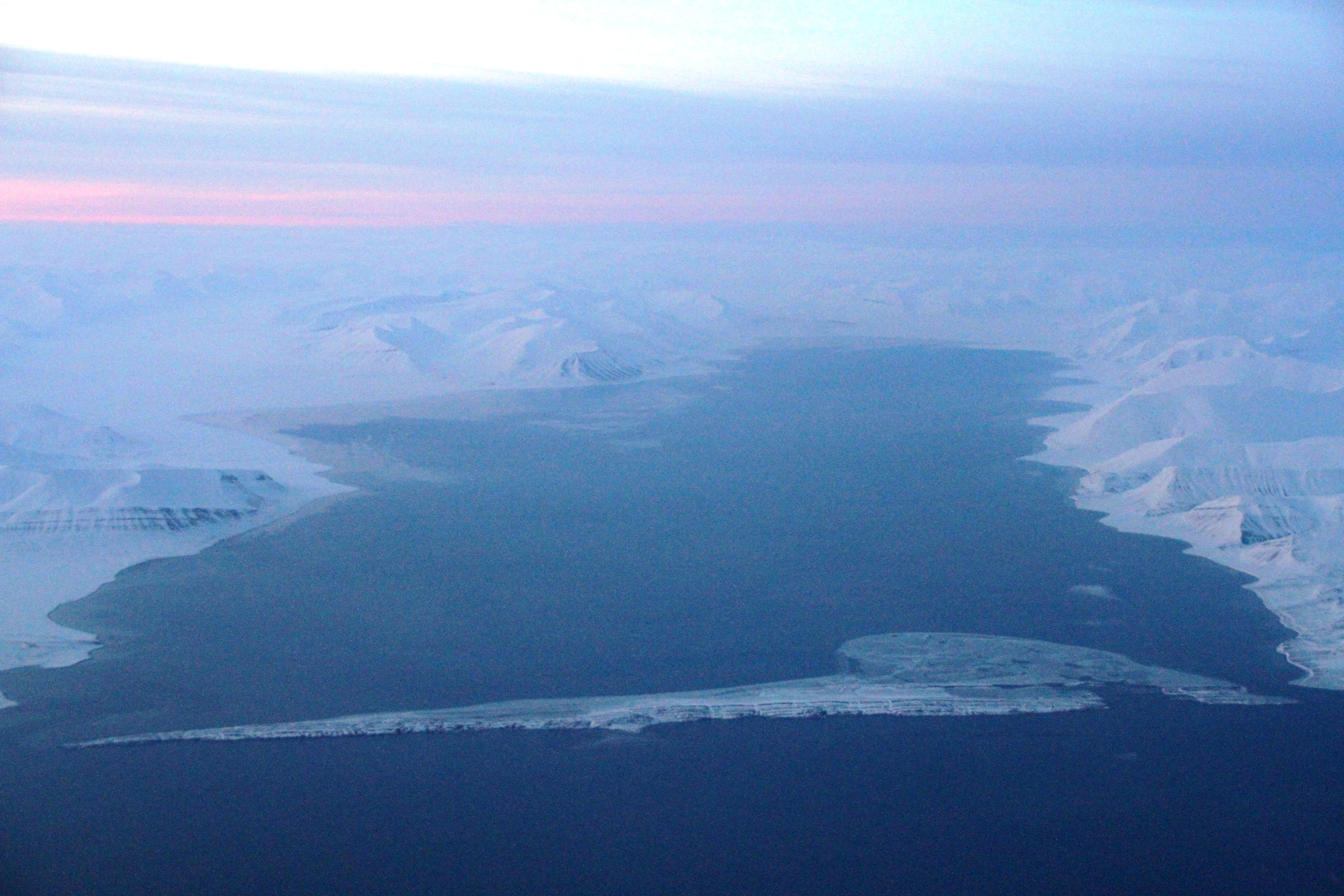
Van Mijenfjorden and Akseløya, with Mariaholmen to the right.

Mariaholmen is an islet in Nathorst Land at the mouth of Van Mijenfjorden at Spitsbergen, Svalbard. It is located south of Akseløya, between Akseløya and Måseneset. While Akselsundet north of Akseløya is regarded as the main entrance to Van Mijenfjorden, Mariasundet between Mariaholmen and Måseneset is also navigable.

Mariaholmen is composed of Upper Permian (Kapp Starostin Fm.), Lower Triassic (Vardebukta Fm. and Tvillingodden Fm.) and Middle Triassic (Bravaisberget Fm.) sedimentary deposits that have been stratigraphically tilted to a vertical position.
