= Willem Cornelisz van Muyden =

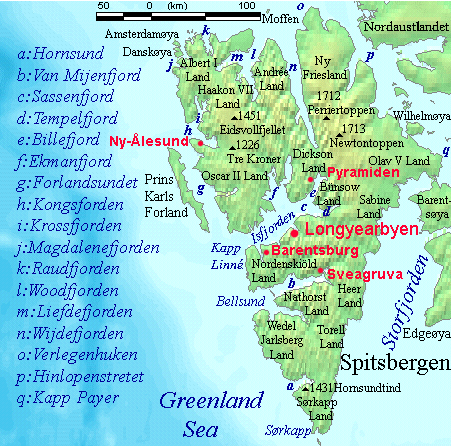
Spitsbergen

Willem Cornelisz. van Muyden (c. 1573, in Muiden – 1634, in Amsterdam) was an early 17th-century skipper. He is known in the Netherlands as De Eerste Walvisvanger ("The First Whaleman") (1613). Van Muydenbukta and Van Mijenfjorden on the west coast of Spitsbergen and Kapp Muyen on the west coast of Jan Mayen are named after him.

== Life ==
Willem van Muy(d)en started his career as a ship's carpenter, but in 1607 he shipped aboard a vessel loaded with grain for Italy. In 1609 he sailed to Norway and Saint-Malo. In 1611 he made his way to the Mediterranean, where his ship was seized by pirates. He arrived in Middelburg in January of the following year.

A company in Amsterdam under Lambert van Tweenhuysen, in the wake of the first whaling expedition to Spitsbergen, sent Van Muyden in the Neptunus to the same locale in 1612. They hired the absconding bankrupt Alan Sallows as pilot, a man who had spent twenty years "in the Northern Seas" in the service of the Muscovy Company.

On 13 May (NS) the expedition ran into the English off Bjørnøya. The following day there was talk among the English to detain Sallows, but they ultimately decided to let him go. On 5 June the ship sailed into the northern entrance of Forlandsundet, where, the next day, Sallows told the English of the loss of their merchant Kijn, who had fallen off a cliff and broken his neck. The same day the Neptunus sailed to the south. They anchored in a small bay on the north shore of Bellsund later called Van Muyden Harbor (modern Van Muydenbukta). Lacking the expertise of Basque whalemen, they had little success with catching whales, and when the men asked Sallows how to catch walrus and stated that they were prepared to follow his instructions, he provided none. Sallows proved incompetent. He appears to have never been to Spitsbergen before, as the information he provided the Dutch was incorrect; he in fact knew nothing about the country or its fauna. He further angered the men when drunk, daily consuming brandy.

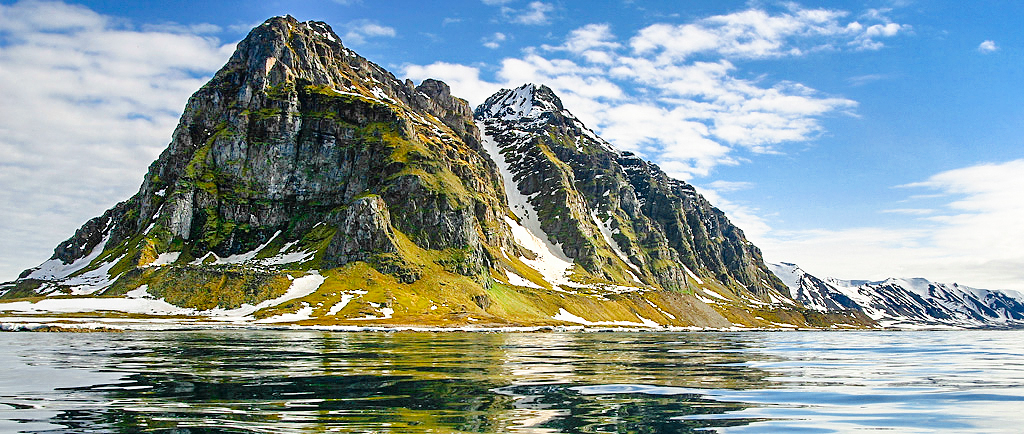
Prins Karls Forland in 2006

The Neptunus returned to Amsterdam on 17 September. Evidently learning from their error, the Dutch recruited twelve Basque whalemen from St. Jean de Luz for the following year. Van Tweenhuysen equipped two ships, the Neptunus, with Van Muyden again as master, and the Fortuyn, Jan Jacobsz Vrijer, master. The Neptunus and Fortuyn arrived off the Spitsbergen coast on 27 May. On 2 June the ships arrived at Prins Karls Forland. In mid-June they sailed into Trygghamna, on the north side of Isfjorden, but were ordered away by the English just three days later. After being driven out of Grønfjorden and Van Muydenbukta, Van Muyden sailed to Recherche Fjord and settled in a little cove on its western shore, which he christened Schoonhaven (modern Josephbukta). From 25 June to 20 July they caught eighteen bowhead whales, thirty walrus, and two polar bears. They were discovered here by the English on 21 July. They seized their goods and detained Vrijer until 25 July and Van Muyden until 28 July. Despite being ordered away, Van Muyden continued along the coast until 9 August, when he sailed homewards.

After the Noordsche Compagnie was founded Van Muyden again sailed to Spitsbergen in 1614 and 1615. In 1616 he was again master of the Neptunus, this time on a whaling voyage to the recently discovered Jan Mayen. He was among the first to arrive at the island early in June; he left in late July with a full cargo of oil. He appears to have sailed north in 1618, and in 1619 and again in 1621 he once more went to Jan Mayen. For ten years he was living on Rapenburg. After 1624, he moved to Keizersgracht and lived near the "Greenland" warehouses.
