= List of lighthouses in Svalbard =

This is a list of lighthouses in Svalbard.

== Lighthouses ==
Name	Image	Year built	Coordinates	Class of Light	Focal height	NGA number	Admiralty number	Range nml
Akseløya Lighthouse	Image	1946	77°44′49.3″N 14°34′12.6″E	Fl W 5s.	15 metres (49 ft)	17820	L4304	8 nautical miles (15 km; 9.2 mi)
Kapp Linné Lighthouse	Image	1933	78°03′45.3″N 13°37′12.5″E	Fl W 10s.	21 metres (69 ft)	17804	L4314	10 nautical miles (19 km; 12 mi)
Kapp Martin Lighthouse	Image	1945	77°43′11.2″N 13°56′38.6″E	Fl (2) W 10s.	18 metres (59 ft)	17816	L4302	9 nautical miles (17 km; 10 mi)
Vestpynten Lighthouse		n/a	78°15′06.7″N 15°25′01.2″E	Fl W 5s.	n/a	17812	L4318	10 nautical miles (19 km; 12 mi)

== See also ==
- Lists of lighthouses and lightvessels
