= Akselsundet =

Body of water in Svalbard, Norway

Coordinates: 77.7516°N 14.5559°E

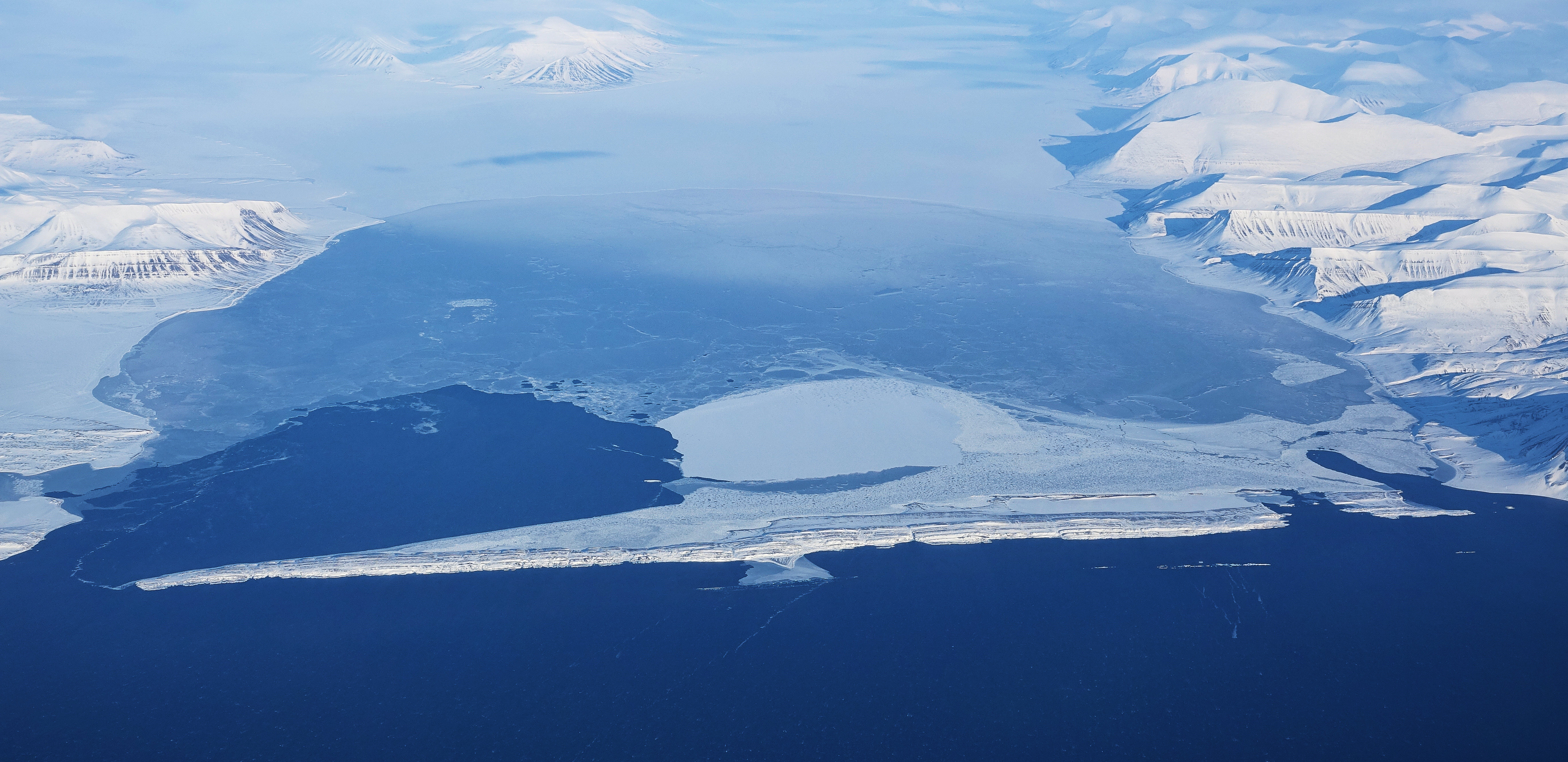
Van Mijenfjorden and Akseløya, with Akselsundet to the left.

Akselsundet is a sound between Van Mijenfjorden and Bellsund at Spitsbergen, Svalbard. It has a width of about 1.2 kilometers, located north of Akseløya, and is the main entrance to Van Mijenfjorden. There are strong tidal currents in the strait, up to five to six knots. The entrance is marked by a light at Birkelandodden, the northern point of Akseløya.
