= New Netherland Company =

Chartered company of Dutch merchants (1600s)

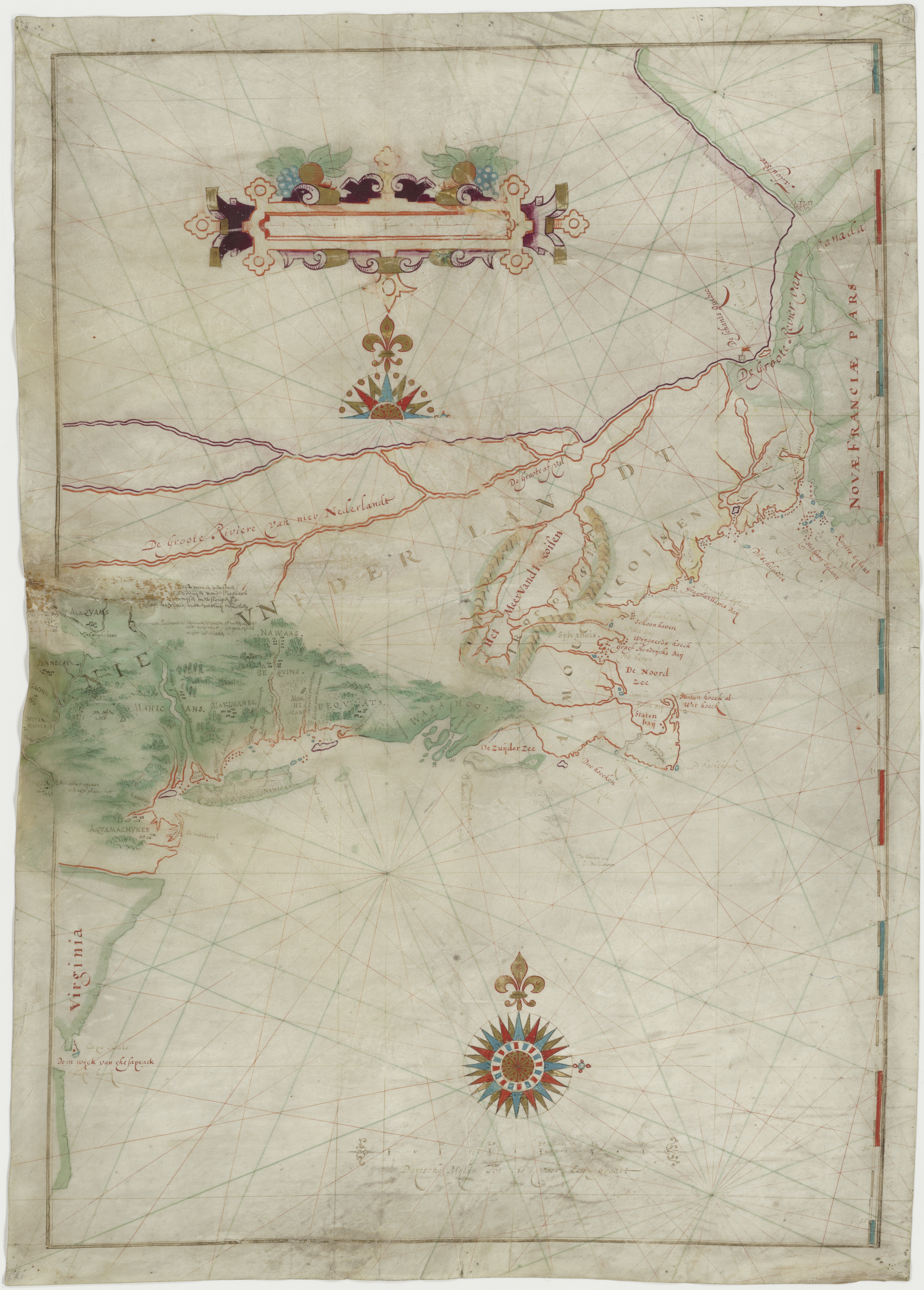
Block's Figurative Map of his 1614 voyage, presented to the Estates-General along with the petition of a charter"

New Netherland Company (Dutch: Nieuw-Nederland Compagnie) was a chartered company of Dutch merchants.

Following Henry Hudson’s exploration of the east coast of North America on behalf of the Dutch East India Company in 1609, several Dutch merchants sent ships to trade with the Native Americans (mainly fur) and to search for the Northwest Passage. In order to maximize their profits these merchants decided to form the New Netherland Company. On 11 October 1614 Block, Christiaensen, and a group of twelve other merchants (list below) presented to the States General a petition to receive exclusive trading privileges for the area. The charter granted a monopoly of trade between the 40th and 45th parallel for a period of three years, starting on 1 January 1615. In 1618 the Company's charter wasn't renewed because negotiations for the formation of the Dutch West India Company were well advanced. After 1618 New Netherland was open to all traders, but the majority of trade was still conducted by the founders of the New Netherland Company until the establishment of the Dutch West India Company in 1621.

== Founders ==
- Jonas Witsen (Amsterdam)
- Simon Morissen (Amsterdam)
- Hans Hongers (Amsterdam)
- Paulus Pelgrom (Amsterdam)
- Lambrecht van Tweenhuyzen (Amsterdam)
- Arnolt van Lybergen (Amsterdam)
- Wessel Schenck (Amsterdam)
- Hans Claessen (Amsterdam)
- Berent Sweertssen (Amsterdam)
- Peter Clementsen Brouwer (Hoorn)
- John Clementsen Kies (Hoorn)
- Cornelis Volckertsen (Hoorn)

== See also ==
- Fort Nassau
- European chartered companies founded around the 17th century (in French)
