= Morten Bredsdorff =

Norwegian navy officer (1888-1984)

Peter Morten Bredsdorff
- Born: Peter Morten Larsen; 2 December 1888; Kragerø, Norway
- Died: 18 February 1984 (aged 95)
- Burial place: Kragerø
- Education: Norwegian Naval Academy
- Military career
- Allegiance: Norway
- Branch: Royal Norwegian Navy
- Rank: Commander
- Commands: 3rd Naval District
- Conflicts: World War II
- Awards: Commander of the Order of Dannebrog; Commander of the Legion of Honour; Defence Medal 1940–1945 with Star; St. Olav's Medal With Oak Branch
- Other work: Whaling fleet controller, trading merchant

Peter Morten Bredsdorff (2 December 1888 – 18 February 1984) was a Norwegian naval officer.

== Early life ==
On 2 December 1888, Bredsdorff was born in Kragerø, Norway. Bredsdorff's parents were ship-owner Harald Larsen (1851–1929) and Gunhild née Bredsdorff (1858–1944). In 1893, Bredsdorff assumed the last name Bredsdorff.

== Education ==
Bredsdorff graduated from the Norwegian Naval Academy in 1910.

== Career ==
As a Norwegian naval officer, Bredsdorff rose in ranks to Premier Lieutenant in 1913, Captain in 1928, Captain Commander in 1940 and Commander in 1942.

During the Second World War he served the exiled Norwegian government as chief commander of the 3rd Naval District. Based out of the United Kingdom and Svalbard, he was captured by German forces at Svalbard during Operation Zitronella in 1943. He was imprisoned in Schildberg from January 1944 and then Luckenwalde from January 1945 to the war's end.

After the war he led a naval corps with HQ in Horten from 1946 to 1953. From 1947 to 1951 he led the Naval Society and also served as aide-de-camp to Haakon VII of Norway. Bredsdorff was a Commander of the Order of Dannebrog and of the Legion of Honour, was decorated with the Defence Medal 1940–1945 with Star, the St. Olav's Medal with Oak Branch, the Haakon VII 70th Anniversary Medal and the Haakon VII Jubilee Medal 1905-1955.

He then left the armed forces, working as a controller in the whaling fleet between 1953 and 1957 and then as a trading merchant until 1960.

== Personal life ==
Bredsdorff died at 95 years of age and is buried in Kragerø.
