= Bellsund =

Sound on the west coast of Spitsbergen, Svalbard, Norway

Coordinates: 77°40′N 14°15′E

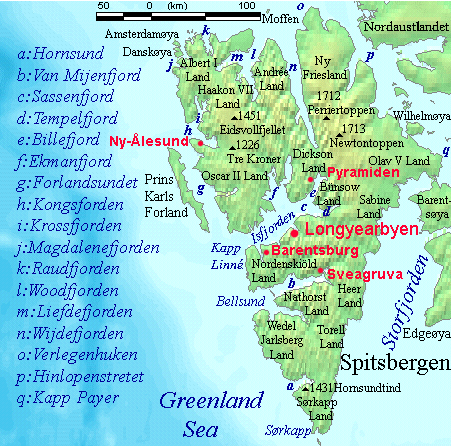
Bellsund lies on Spitsbergen's west coast.

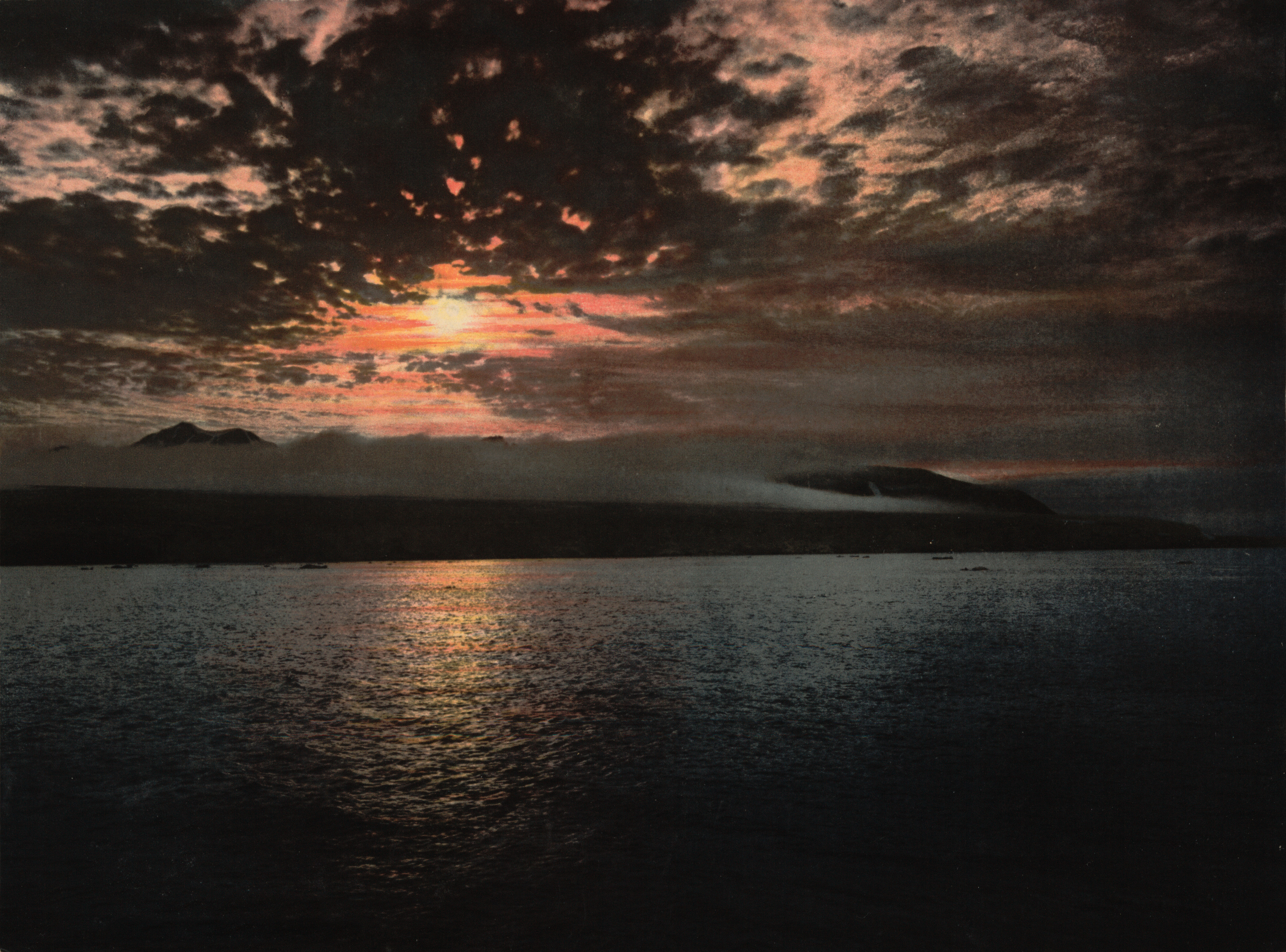
Midnight sun, Bell Sound, Norway, between ca. 1890 and ca. 1900

Bellsund is a 20-kilometer (12 mi) long sound on the west coast of Spitsbergen, part of the Svalbard archipelago of Norway. It is separated from Van Mijenfjorden by the islands of Akseløya and Mariaholmen. Bellsund is located south of Nordenskiöld Land and north of Wedel Jarlsberg Land.

== History ==
Bellsund was first seen by William Barents in 1596. He simply referred to it as Inwyck (inlet). In 1610 Jonas Poole explored Bellsund, giving the fjord the name it retains to this day. He named it after a nearby bell-shaped mountain. In 1612 the Dutchman Willem Cornelisz. van Muyden was the first to attempt to catch whales here, but he wasn't very successful as he didn't have any Basque whalemen among his crew. In 1613, Basque, Dutch, and French whaling vessels resorted to Bellsund, but were either ordered away by armed English vessels or forced to pay a fine of some sort.

In 1614 the Dutch agreed to give Bellsund to the English, but only for one season. In 1615 the Dutch built the first semi-permanent whaling station in Spitsbergen at the mouth of Schoonhoven (Recherche Fjord), on the south side of Bellsund. It was appropriated by the English the following year. In 1626 this station was damaged by York and Hull whalers, who then sailed to their whaling station in Midterhukhamna, just across the entrance of Van Keulenfjorden. Here they were found by the heavily armed flagship of the London whaling fleet, the Hercules, under admiral William Goodlad. A two-hour battle ensued, resulting in defeat for the Hull and York fleet and their expulsion from Spitsbergen. Hull continued to send whaling vessels to occupy this station for the next 25 years, while the English as a whole probably resorted to Bellsund at least until the late 1650s.
