= Akseløya =

Akseløya Lighthouse
- Location: Akseløya; Svalbard; Norway
- Coordinates: 77°44′49.3″N 14°34′12.6″E

Tower
- Constructed: 1946
- Construction: metal skeletal tower
- Height: 7 metres (23 ft)
- Shape: square piramydal skeletal tower with enclosed upper part
- Markings: black tower, red upper part
- Power source: solar power

Light
- Focal height: 15 metres (49 ft)
- Range: 8 nautical miles (15 km; 9.2 mi)
- Characteristic: Fl W 5s.

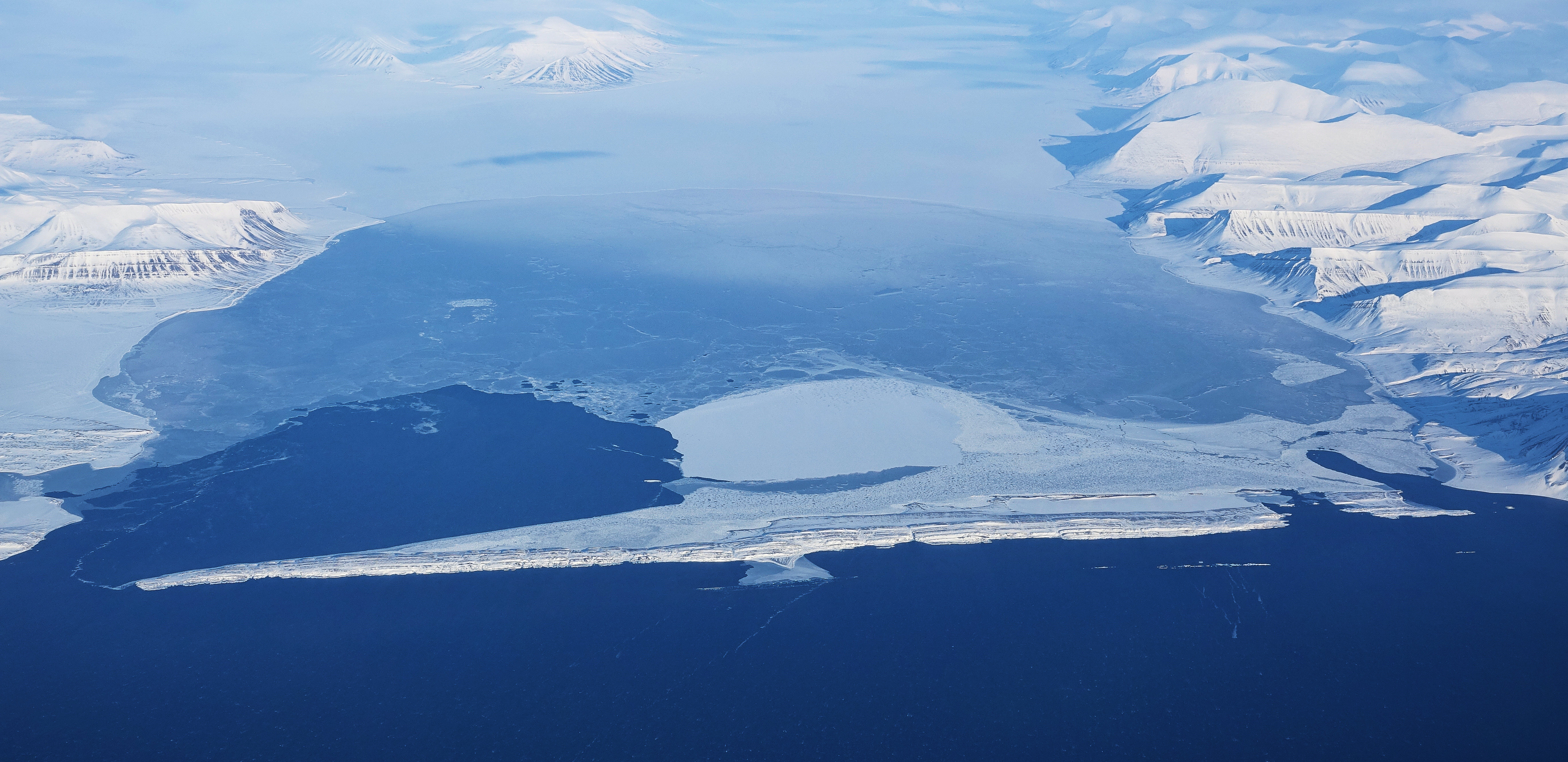
Akseløya seen from west

Akseløya (English: Axel Island) is a long, narrow island (about 8.5 km long and 1 km wide) at the mouth of Van Mijenfjorden, separating Van Mijenfjorden from Bellsund. It is separated from the mainland by Akselsundet to the north, and another narrow strait to the south. The islands are named after the schooner Aksel Thordsen, which was chartered by Adolf Erik Nordenskiöld for an expedition to Svalbard in 1864.

Akseløya is oriented in a northwest–southeast direction, with Akselsundet on the north side and Mariasundet on the south side. These straits provide passage to and from Van Mijenfjorden. Both straits are navigable, but Akselsundet is the one mainly used by ship traffic. The tidal currents reach speeds of five to six knots.

Akseløya Light is a lighthouse on Birkelandodden, at the very north of the island. It was erected in September 1946 as one of three lights to aid shipping in Van Mijenfjorden. The lighthouse entered service on 20 September the same year.

At the southern tip, called Russeltvedtodden, there are several cultural heritage sites. These include a Russian Pomor house foundation and grave from the 19th century, as well as a Norwegian trapping cabin (winter cabin) that was built in 1898 by Johan Hagerup and four men on behalf of Consul Holmboe. It was regularly used for hunting until about 1907, and meteorological measurements were carried out here for several years. At the same time, they built an outpost in Midterhukhamna and another in Reindalen further north, where they shot 50–60 reindeer.[3] The facilities were part of what was known as Trapping Area 5 (Midterhuken). The cabin was used for Norwegian fur trapping in the period before World War II.

Near these ruins are also the remains of an installation from Kristian Birkeland's Aurora Borealis expedition in 1902–03. Birkeland’s expedition used a cabin on Akseløya measuring 6 x 4 meters, and left behind various objects that are now protected.

The Governor of Svalbard oversees extended monitoring and maintenance of the site, which is among the 50 most prioritized cultural heritage sites on Svalbard.

== See also ==
- List of lighthouses in Svalbard
