= Van Mijenfjorden =

Fjord in Norway's Svalbard archipelago

Coordinates: 77°47.5′N 15°30′E

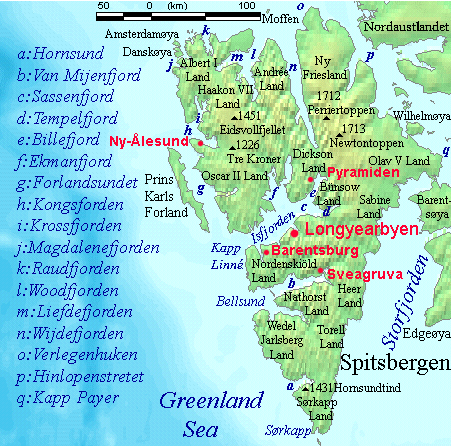
Van Mijenfjorden (labelled b) reaches from Bellsund in the west to Sveagruva in Spitsbergen's interior.

Van Mijenfjorden is the third-longest fjord in Norway's Svalbard archipelago. It lies in the southern portion of Spitsbergen island, south of Nordenskiöld Land and north of Nathorst Land. The fjord is 83 km (52 mi) long, being separated from Bellsund further out by Akseløya and Mariaholmen. The settlement of Sveagruva lies on the fjord's north bank.

The fjord is named after the Dutch whaler Willem Cornelisz. van Muyden, who was involved in the trade in 1612 and 1613. Van Mijenfjorden (an obvious corruption of Van Muyden's name) was originally called Lowe Sound, while the small cove north of Axel Island (at the mouth of the fjord) was called Van Muyden's Haven. This latter name was moved from its proper location by Giles and Rep (c. 1710) and "floated over" to where modern cartographers now wrongly place it.
