= Ytterdalsegga =

Mountain ridge in Spitsbergen, Svalbard, Norway

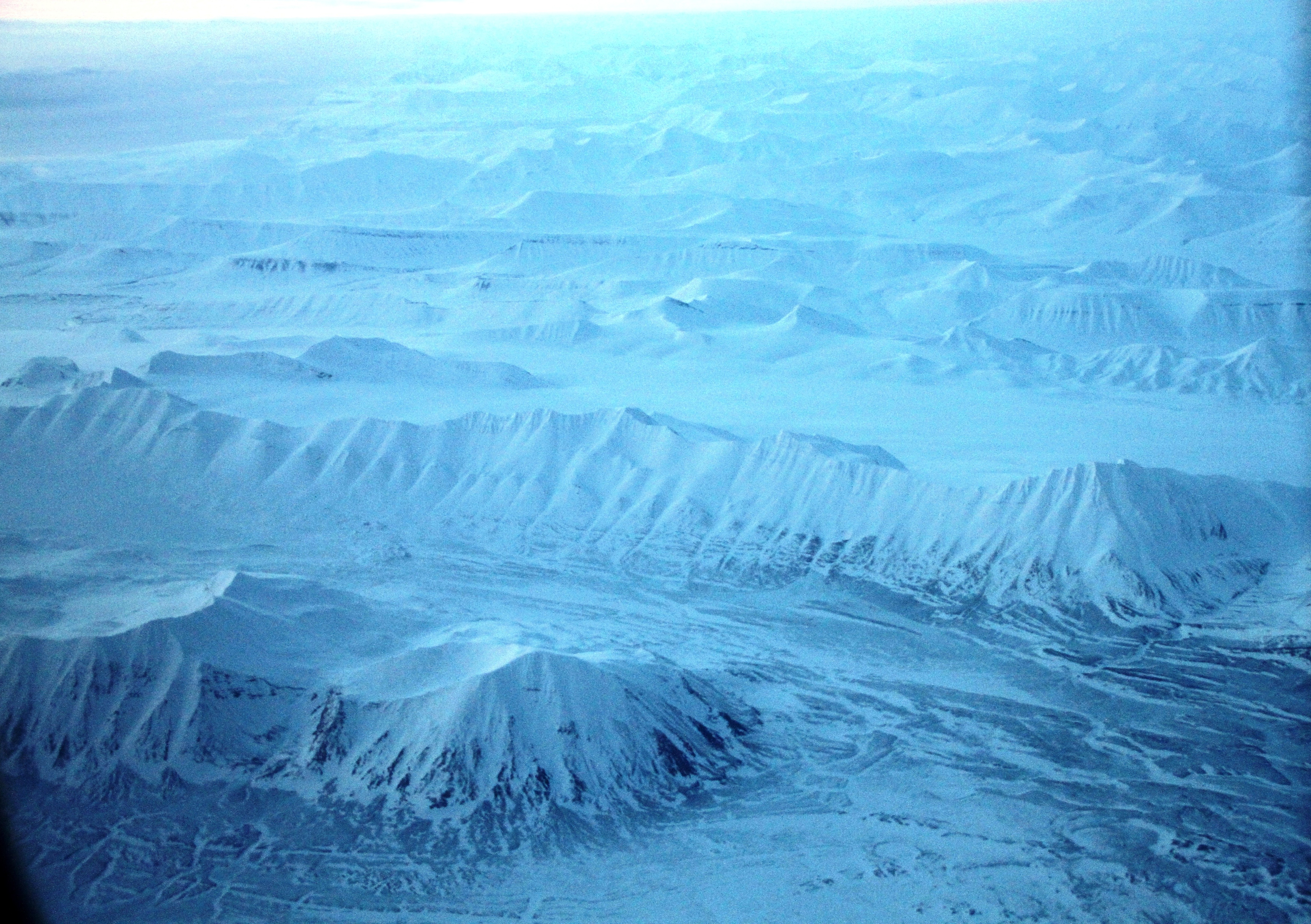
- Ytterdalsegga, with Lågnesflya, Skarkampen, Ytterdalssåta and Ytterdalen in front, and Fridtjovbreen behind

Highest point
- Coordinates: 77°50′12″N 14°18′46″E

Geography
- Location: Svalbard
- Country: Norway
- Region: Spitsbergen
- District: Nordenskiöld Land

Ytterdalsegga ("The outer valley ridge") is a mountain ridge in Nordenskiöld Land at Spitsbergen, Svalbard. It has a length of about seven kilometers, and is located between the valley of Ytterdalen and the glacier of Fridtjovbreen. The highest peaks on the ridge are Foldtinden (736 m.a.s.l.) and Eggtinden (720 m.a.s.l.).
