= Passfjellet =

Coordinates: 77.9943°N 15.0963°E

Passfjellet is a mountain in Nordenskiöld Land at Spitsbergen, Svalbard. It has several peaks, of which the highest is 785 m.a.s.l. The mountain is located between Bjørnsonfjellet, the upper part of Grøndalen, Passdalen and Istjørndalen. The mountain pass Grøndalspasset separates the mountain from the glacier Tavlebreen.
