= Høgsnyta =

Coordinates: 77.9727°N 15.5435°E

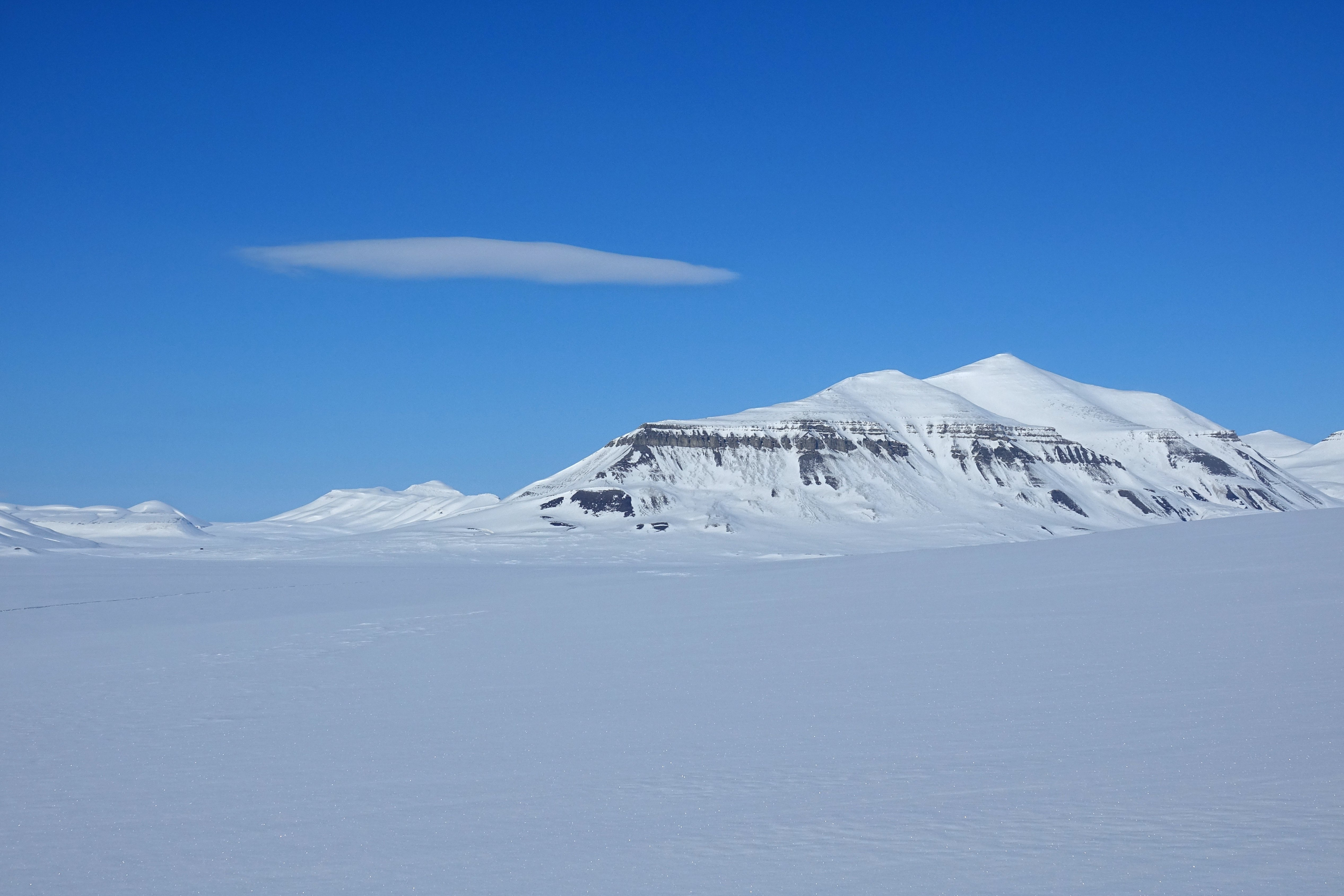
Høgsnyta and Semmeldalen seen from Reindalen on Spitsbergen.

Høgsnyta is a mountain in Nordenskiöld Land at Spitsbergen, Svalbard. It has a height of 989 m.a.s.l. with a secondary peak of 881 meters to the north, and another peak of 780 meters to the south. The mountain is located north of Reindalen and east of Semmeldalen. It is included in the Nordenskiöld Land National Park.
