= Reindalselva =

River of Spitsbergen, Norway

Coordinates: 77.9434°N 15.7682°E

Reindalselva is a river in Nordenskiöld Land at Spitsbergen, Svalbard. The river flows through the valley of Reindalen, starting from the mountain pass Reindalspasset, and ending into the bay Kaldbukta in Van Mijenfjorden. It has created one of Svalbard's largest river deltas. Among its tributary rivers are Semmeldalselva and Tverrdalselva.
