= Kolspissfjella =

Coordinates: 78.0240°N 14.7221°E

Kolspissfjella is a mountain range in Nordenskiöld Land at Spitsbergen, Svalbard. It is located between Grøndalen and Hollendardalen. Among the mountains in the range are Bjørnsonfjellet, Finsenfjellet, Fossilfjellet and Paxfjellet. The range is named after the Norwegian company Kulspids.
