= Fossilfjellet =

Mountain in Spitsbergen, Norway

- Location within Svalbard

Highest point
- Elevation: 828 m (2,717 ft)
- Coordinates: 78.0162°N 14.7195°E

Geography
- Location: Nordenskiöld Land, Spitsbergen, Norway

Fossilfjellet is a mountain in Nordenskiöld Land at Spitsbergen, Svalbard. It has a height of 828 m.a.s.l. and is located between Grøndalen and Hollendardalen, within the range of Kolspissfjella. The upper part of the mountain consists of Tertiary sandstones with plant fossils.
