= Ytterdalen =

Valley of Spitsbergen, Norway

Geography of Ytterdalen
- Coordinates: 77°50′10″N 14°14′16″E

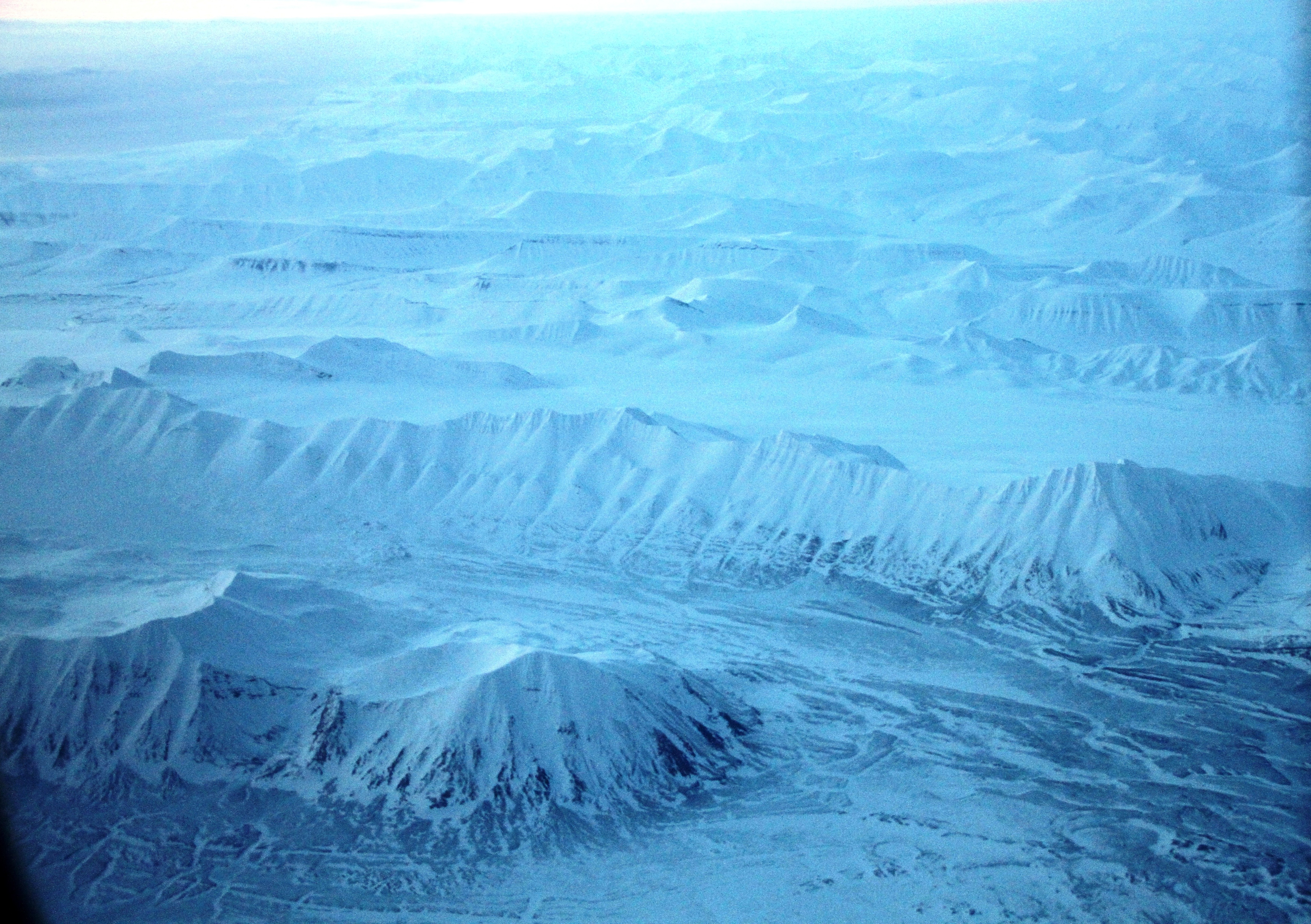
Ytterdalen with Skarkampen and Ytterdalssåta to the left, and Ytterdalsegga and Fridtjovbreen in the background

Ytterdalen ("The outer valley") is a valley in Nordenskiöld Land at Spitsbergen, Svalbard. It has a length of about nine kilometers, and is located between the mountains of Flynibba, Grånutane, Ytterdalsegga, Ytterdalssåta, Skarkampen and Salen. The river of Ytterdalselva from the glacier of Erdmannbreen flows through the valley, and further crosses Lågnesflya on its way to the bay of Van Muydenbukta.
