= Grøndalselva =

River of Spitsbergen, Norway

Grøndalselva is a river in Nordenskiöld Land at Spitsbergen, Svalbard. It flows from Grøndalspasset through the nineteen kilometer long valley of Grøndalen, and debouches into Grønfjorden.
