= Ytterdalssåta =

Coordinates: 77.818°N 14.156°W

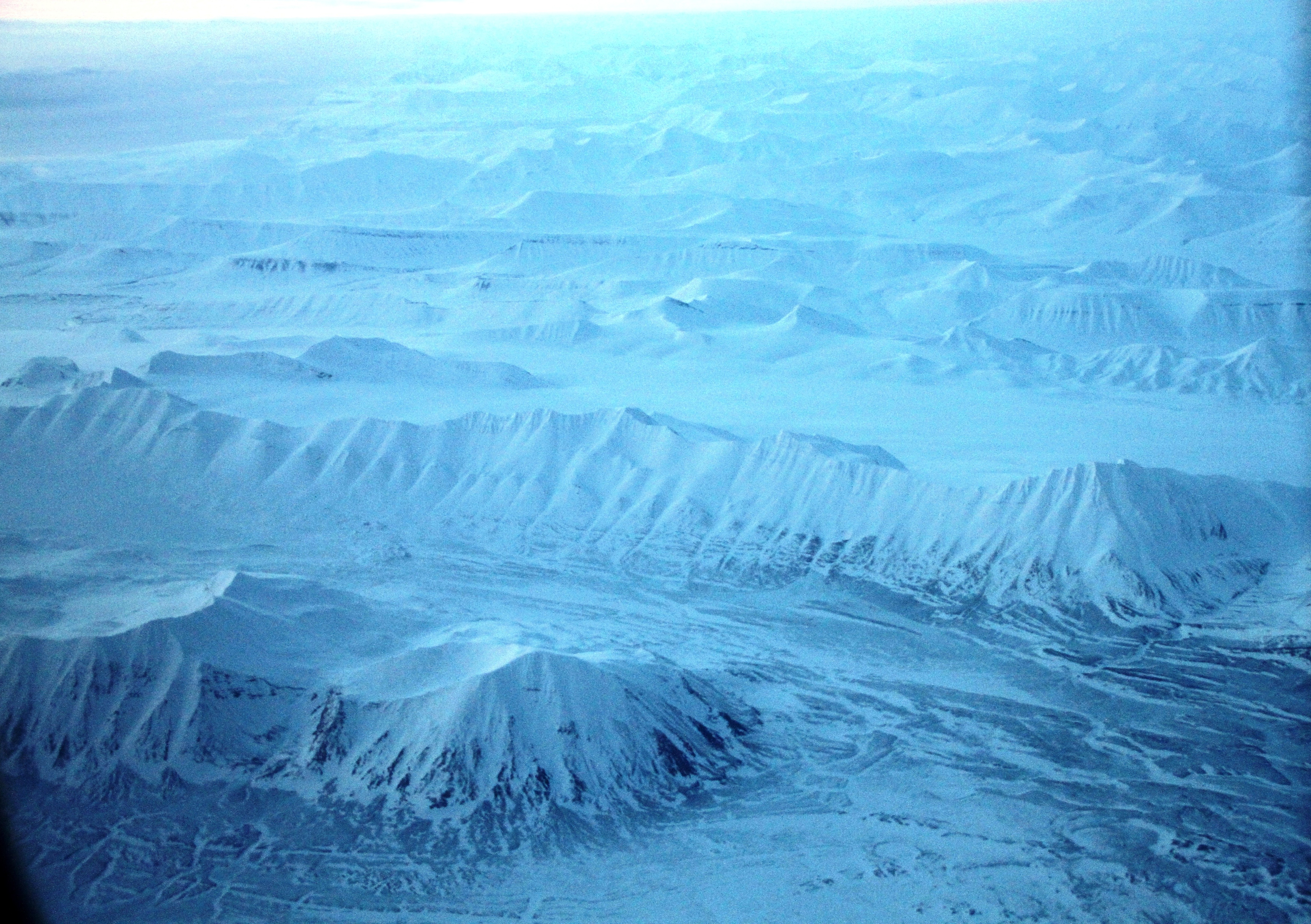
Ytterdalssåta and Ytterdalen, with Fridtjovbreen behind

Ytterdalssåta is a mountain in Nordenskiöld Land at Spitsbergen, Svalbard. It has a height of 598 m.a.s.l. and is located between the plain of Lågnesflya and the valley of Ytterdalen. The mountain pass of Ytterskaret separates Ytterdalssåta from the mountain of Skarkampen further north.
