= Fridtjovhamna =

Bay in Svalbard, Norway

Coordinates: 77°46′24″N 14°35′18″E

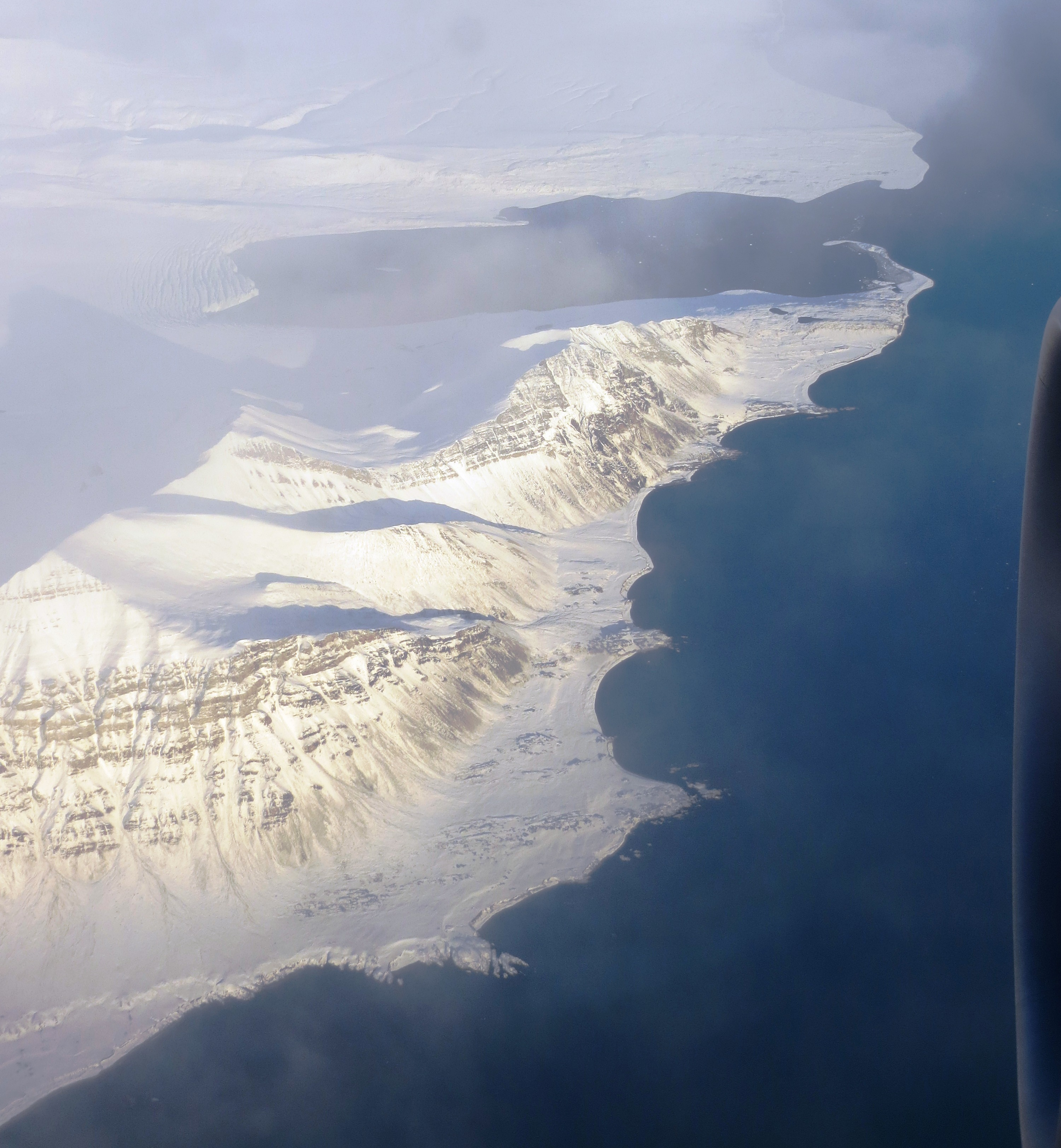

Fridtjovhamna is a bay at the northern side of Van Mijenfjorden in Nordenskiöld Land at Spitsbergen, Svalbard. It has a length of about 2.5 kilometers, and is formed by the glacier Fridtjovbreen. It is named after a hunting vessel which was used during Torell's expedition to Spitsbergen. Fridtjovhamna is included in the Nordenskiöld Land National Park.
