= Passfjellbreen =

Glacier in Svalbard, Norway

Coordinates: 78.0141°N 15.0152°E

Passfjellbreen is a glacier in Nordenskiöld Land at Spitsbergen, Svalbard, between Istjørndalen and Hollendardalen, at the northern side of Bjørnsonfjellet and Passfjellet.
