= Sinaiberget =

Coordinates: 77.9510°N 15.2325°E

Sinaiberget is a mountain range in Nordenskiöld Land at Spitsbergen, Svalbard. It is located between Semmeldalen to the east, Kalvdalen (south), Tavlebreen (west) and Passdalen (to the north). The highest summit in the range is 838 m.a.s.l.
