= Nordenskiöldkysten =

Coastal region of Svalbard, Norway

Coordinates: 78°00′00″N 13°39′58″E

Designations

Ramsar Wetland
- Official name: Nordenskiöldkysten
- Designated: 11 December 2010
- Reference no.: 1968

Nordenskiöldkysten is a coastal region at Spitsbergen, Svalbard, Norway. It forms the western coast of Nordenskiöld Land between the points Steinneset and Lewinodden, with a coastline of about sixty kilometers. Nordenskiöldkysten is included in the Nordenskiöld Land National Park. The coastal region, including the nearby mountain Ingeborgfjellet, was decided a Ramsar site in 2011.
