= Sweden proper =

Term used to distinguish between fully integrated parts of Sweden and its territories

Sweden at the height of its territorial expansion, following the Treaty of Roskilde in 1658. The map shows Sweden proper in dark green, represented in the Riksdag of the Estates, while the other shades of green stand for different dominions and possessions.

Sweden proper (Swedish: Egentliga Sverige, literally 'Actual Sweden') is a term used to distinguish those territories that were fully integrated into the Kingdom of Sweden, as opposed to the dominions and possessions of, or states in union with, Sweden. Only the estates of the realm of Sweden proper were represented in the Riksdag of the Estates.

Specifically this means that, from approximately 1155–1156 until the Treaty of Fredrikshamn in 1809, Sweden proper included the bulk of present-day Finland as a fully integrated part of the realm. After 1809, however, the term has been used to distinguish the western part from the former eastern half of the realm, i.e. Sweden from Finland.

Skåne, Halland, Blekinge, and Bohuslän, formerly parts of Denmark and Norway, came under the Swedish Crown by the Treaty of Roskilde in 1658; however, it was not until 1719 that they were fully integrated and became part of Sweden proper.

Sweden proper, a geographical reference that has changed over time, contrasts with Finland Proper, a province in southwestern Finland that gave its name to all of Finland.

== See also ==
- Svealand
- Lands of Sweden
- Provinces of Sweden
