= Ingeborgfjellet =

Mountain in Spitsbergen, Norway

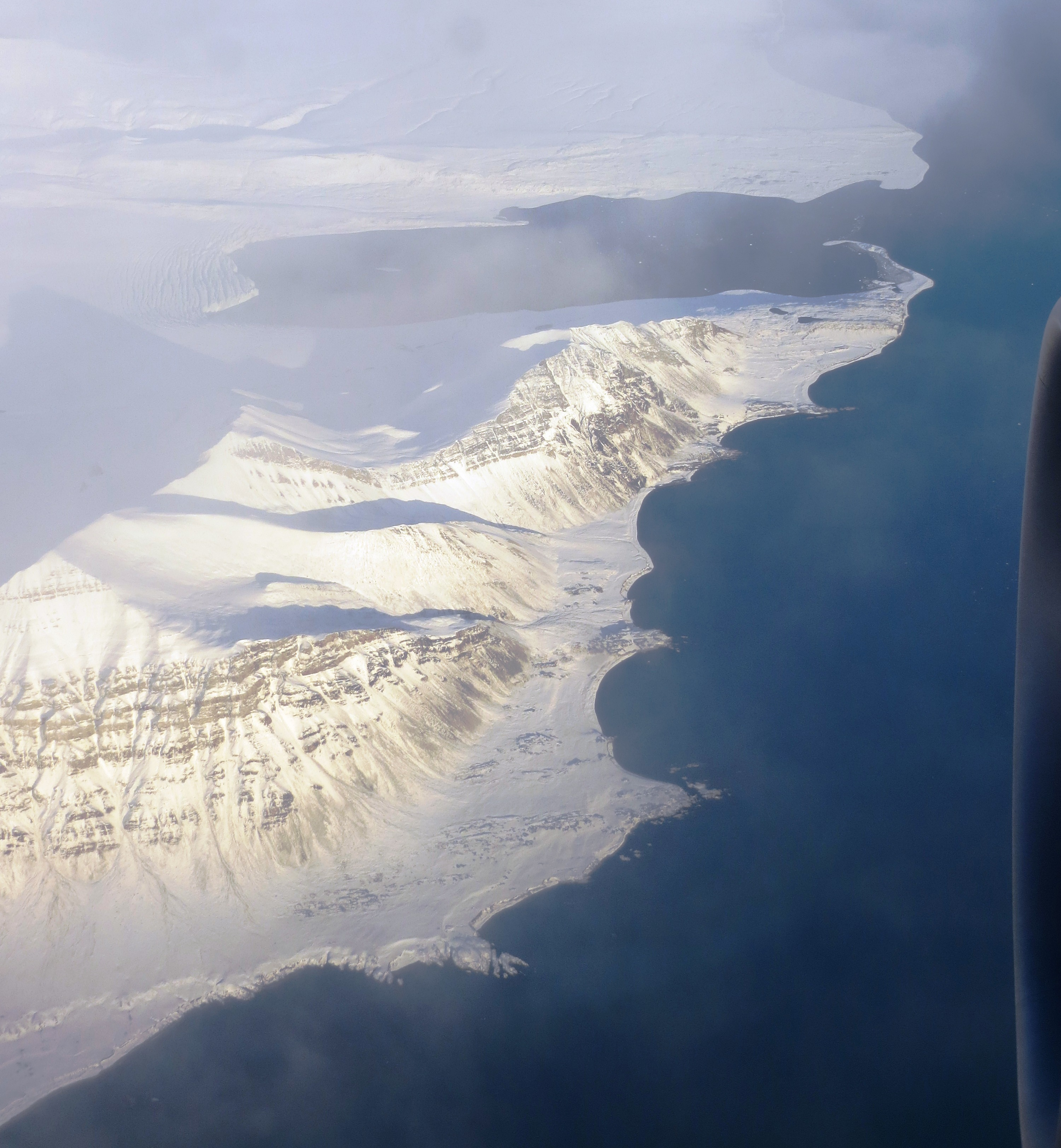
- Aerial view, looking east

Highest point
- Elevation: 714 m (2,343 ft)
- Coordinates: 77°46′N 14°25′E

Geography
- Location within Svalbard
- Location: Nordenskiöld Land, Spitsbergen, Norway

Ingeborgfjellet is a mountain in Nordenskiöld Land in Spitsbergen, Svalbard. It has a height of 715 m with a secondary peak of 620 m. It is included in the Nordenskiöld Land National Park, and has an important bird cliff. Ingeborgfjellet is located north of Bellsund and west of the glacier Fridtjovbreen. It forms a characteristic ridge and is an easily recognized landmark viewed from sea.

== Environment ==
Ingeborgfjellet was designated a Ramsar site in 2011, together with the nearby coastal region of Nordenskiöldkysten. It has also been identified as an Important Bird Area (IBA) by BirdLife International because it supports about 55,000 breeding pairs of little auks.
