= Possessions of Sweden =

Sweden at the height of its territorial expansion, following the Treaty of Roskilde in 1658.

This is a list of possessions of Sweden held outside of Sweden proper during the early modern period.

== Fiefs ==
Fiefs that were held for a short period of time.

- Scania (Agreement of Helsingborg, 1332–1360)
- Hven (Agreement of Helsingborg, 1332–1360)
- Blekinge (Agreement of Helsingborg, 1332–1360)
- Halland (Treaty of Varberg, 1343–1360)
- Elbing (Treaty of Altmark, 1629–1635)
- Braunsberg (Treaty of Altmark, 1629–1635)
- Pillau (Treaty of Altmark, 1629–1635)
- Fischhausen (Treaty of Altmark, 1629–1635)
- Lochstädt (Treaty of Altmark, 1629–1635)
- Memel (Treaty of Altmark, 1629–1635)
- Bremen (Recess of Stede, 1654–1666)
- Bornholm (Treaty of Roskilde, 1658–1660)
- Trøndelag (Treaty of Roskilde, 1658–1660)

== Colonies ==
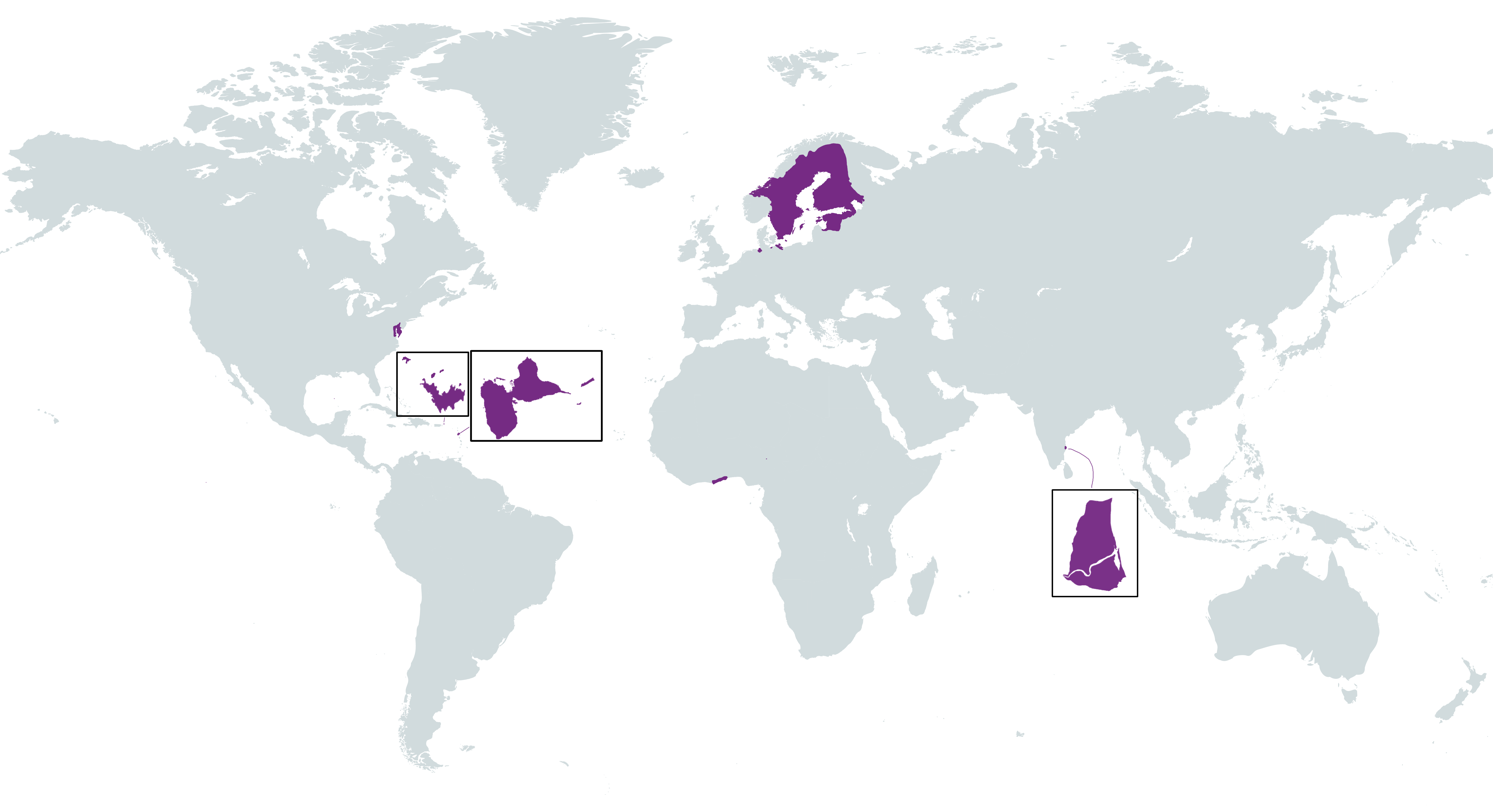
Map of the Swedish Empire and all of its colonial possessions

- Fort Apollonia, present Beyin: 1655–1657.
- Fort Christiansborg, present Osu: 1652–1658
- Fort Batenstein, present Butri: 1650–1656.
- Fort Witsen, present Takoradi: 1653–1658.
- Carolusborg: April 1650 – January/February 1658, 10 December 1660- 22 April 1663
- New Sweden on the banks of the Delaware River in North America: 1638–1655
- Guadeloupe (1813–1814; returned to France)
- Saint-Barthélemy (1784–1878; sold to France)
- Esequibo (1732–1739)
- Tobago (1733)
- Porto Novo (1733; lost to the French and British East India Companies)

== Mint cities ==
Cities, held outside the realm, where Swedish mints were established.

- Stade (Saxony)
- Osnabrück (Saxony)
- Erfurt (Thuringia)
- Mainz (Electorate of the Palatinate)
- Würzburg (Bavaria)
- Fürth (Bavaria)
- Nuremberg (Bavaria)
- Augsburg (Bavaria)
- Elbląg (Poland, 1626–1635 and 1655–1660)
- Toruń (Poland, 1655–1658)

== Territories held under martial law ==
- Brodnica, Poland (conquest in the Polish War, held until 1629)
- Tczew, Poland (conquest in the Polish War, held until 1629)
- Orneta, Poland (conquest in the Polish War, held until 1629)
- Melzak, Poland (conquest in the Polish War, held until 1629)
- Frombork, Poland (conquest in the Polish War, held until 1629)
- Malbork, Poland (conquest in the Polish War, held until 1629)
- Sztum, Poland (conquest in the Polish War, held until 1629)
- Gdańska Głowa, Poland (conquest in the Polish War, held until 1629)
- Landsberg (Gorzów Wielkopolski) (agreement with Brandenburg, 1641–1643)
- Frankfurt (Oder) (agreement with Brandenburg, 1641–1643)
- Leipzig (agreement with Saxony, 1646–1648)
- Memmingen (agreement with Bavaria, 1647–1648)
- Überlingen (agreement with Bavaria, 1647–1648)

== See also ==
- Swedish Empire
- Swedish overseas colonies
- Swedish colonization of the Americas
- Lands of Sweden
- Provinces of Sweden
- Dominions of Sweden
- Unions of Sweden
- Thirty Years' War
- History of Guadeloupe
- History of Ghana
- Swedish settlement of Svalbard
- Swedish slave trade
