= Kjeglefjella =

Mountain range in Spitsbergen, Svalbard

Coordinates: 78.0763°N 14.8020°E

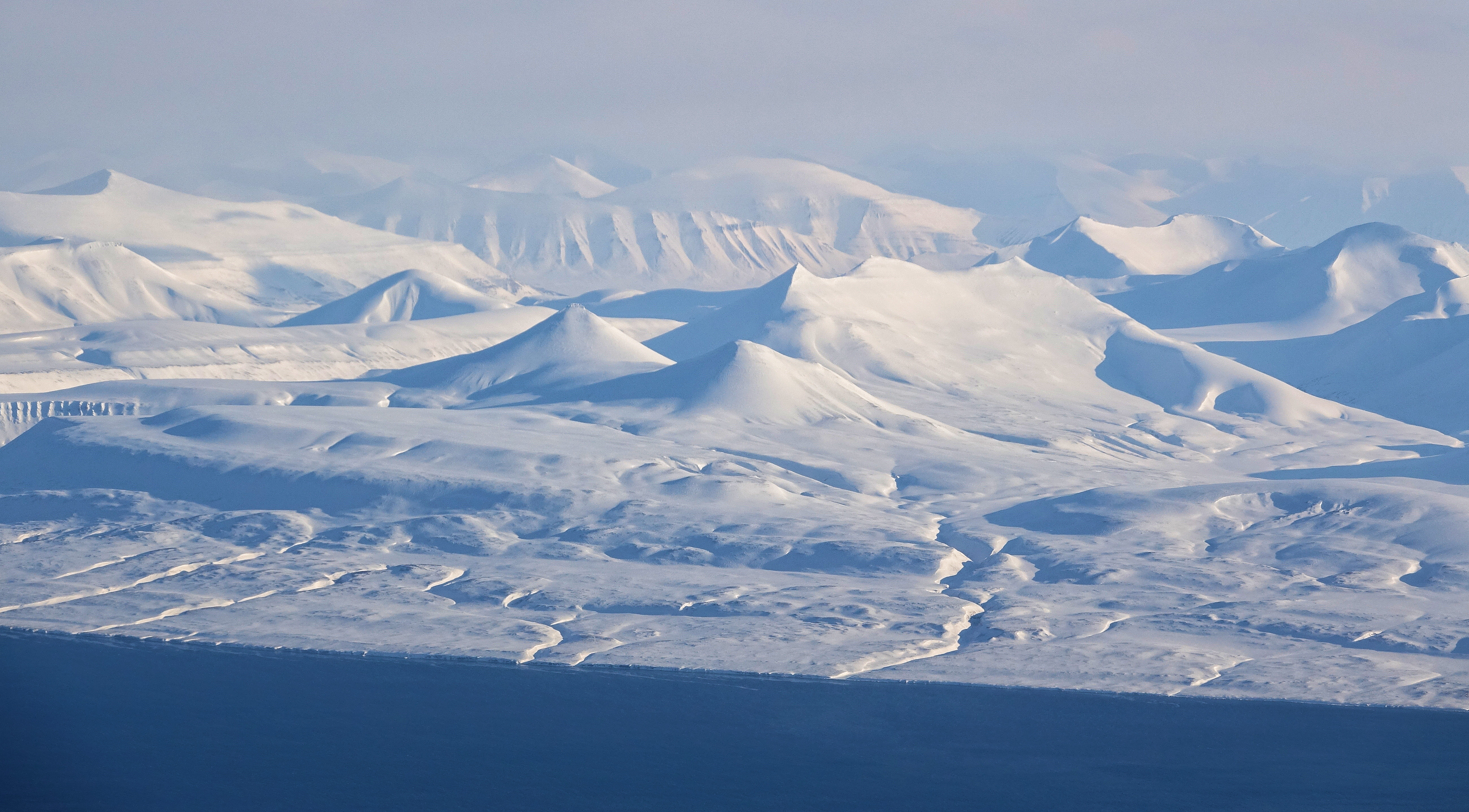
Most of the Kjeglefjella range

Kjeglefjella (Cone Mountains) is a mountain range in Nordenskiöld Land at Spitsbergen, Svalbard. It is located between Hollendardalen, Passfjellbreen, Lailadalen and Colesbukta, and has an extension of about fourteen kilometers. Among the mountains in the range are Vesle Kjeglefjellet, Luxtoppen, Noxtoppen, Ravnhøgda, Vesuv, Vestalfjellet, Rundkollen and Oppkuven.
