= Grøndalspasset =

Mountain pass in Svalbard, Norway

Coordinates: 77°58′54″N 15°06′30″E

Grøndalspasset is a mountain pass in Nordenskiöld Land at Spitsbergen, Svalbard. It separates the valley Grøndalen at the western side from Passdalen running eastwards. At its southern side is the glacier Tavlebreen; and its northern side, the mountain Passfjellet.
