= Femvatna =

Lakes at Spitsbergen, Svalbard

- Location in Svalbard
- Location: Nordenskiöld Land at Spitsbergen, Svalbard
- Coordinates: 77.840°N 13.706°E
- Type: natural freshwater lakes
- Basin countries: Norway

Femvatna (The Five Lakes) is a group of five small lakes in Nordenskiöld Land at Spitsbergen, Svalbard. The lakes are located east of the headland of Kapp Bjørset, and northwest of the plain of Lågnesflya.
