= Vesuv (Svalbard) =

Coordinates: 78.0736°N 14.8265°E

Vesuv is a mountain in Nordenskiöld Land at Spitsbergen, Svalbard. It has a conical shape and a pointed summit, and reaches a height of 741 m.a.s.l. It is located southwest of Colesbukta, in Kjeglefjella.
