= Kaldbukta =

Bay in Van Mijenfjorden, Spitsbergen, Svalbard

Coordinates: 77.8394°N 15.3806°E

Kaldbukta is a bay in Van Mijenfjorden in Nordenskiöld Land at Spitsbergen, Svalbard. The bay has a width of about 11.5 kilometers. The large valley Reindalen ends into Kaldbukta. The largest river flowing into the bay is Reindalselva, and also Semmeldalselva and Kalvdalselva ends in Kaldbukta.
