= Finsenfjellet =

Mountain in Spitsbergen, Norway

Coordinates: 78.0096°N 14.8733°E

Finsenfjellet is a mountain in Nordenskiöld Land at Spitsbergen, Svalbard. Its highest peak is 818 m.a.s.l. The mountain is located between Grøndalen and Sassendalen. It is named after Danish scientist Niels Ryberg Finsen.
