= Erdmannbreen =

Glacier in Svalbard, Norway

Coordinates: 77.88°N 14.11°E

Erdmannbreen is a glacier in Nordenskiöld Land at Spitsbergen, Svalbard. It is named after Swedish geologist Axel Joachim Erdmann. The glacier has a length of about six kilometers, and is surrounded by the mountains of Malmberget, Ytterdalsgubben and Kosterfjellet. The river of Ytterdalselva originates from Erdmannbreen and flows through the valley of Ytterdalen to the bay of Van Muydenbukta.
