= Passdalen =

Valley of Spitsbergen, Norway

Coordinates: 77.9857°N 15.2073°E

Passdalen is a valley in Nordenskiöld Land at Spitsbergen, Svalbard. The valley has a length of about three kilometres, and extends westwards from Semmeldalen towards Grøndalspasset. It is located north of Sinaiberget and south of Passfjellet.
