= Skarkampen =

Coordinates: 77.834°N 14.110°E

Skarkampen (The Pass Crag) is a mountain in Nordenskiöld Land at Spitsbergen, Svalbard. It has a height of 621 m.a.s.l. and is located between the plain of Lågnesflya and the valley of Ytterdalen. The mountain pass of Ytterskaret separates Skarkampen from the mountain of Ytterdalssåta further south.
