= Semmeldalen =

Valley in Nordenskiöld Land, Spitsbergen, Svalbard

Coordinates: 77°58′00″N 15°23′48″E

Semmeldalen is a valley in Nordenskiöld Land at Spitsbergen, Svalbard. It has a length of about 8 kilometers, and is a tributary valley to Reindalen. The river Semmeldalselva flows through the valley. At the eastern side of the valley is the slope Høgsnythallet and the mountain Høgsnyta. The valley is partly included in the Nordenskiöld Land National Park.
