= Lundströmdalen =

Valley of Spitsbergen, Norway

Coordinates: 78°02′39″N 17°14′23″E

Lundströmdalen is a valley at Spitsbergen, Svalbard, separating Sabine Land and Nordenskiöld Land. It has a length of about 14 kilometers, running from the mountain pass Reindalspasset down to Kjellströmdalen. The valley is named after botanist Axel Nicolaus Lundström.
