= Ytterdalsgubben =

Mountain in Spitsbergen, Svalbard

Coordinates: 77°52′33″N 13°59′43″E

Ytterdalsgubben is a mountain in Nordenskiöld Land at Spitsbergen, Svalbard. It has a height of 901 m.a.s.l. and is located between the plain of Lågnesflya and the glacier of Erdmannbreen. Neighbouring mountains are Malmberget and Kosterfjellet. Viewed from the sea, Ytterdalsgubben is a pyramid shaped landmark, and the highest mountain viewed at this part of the coast.
