= Fridtjovbreen =

Glacier in Svalbard

Coordinates: 77°49′48″N 14°24′36″E

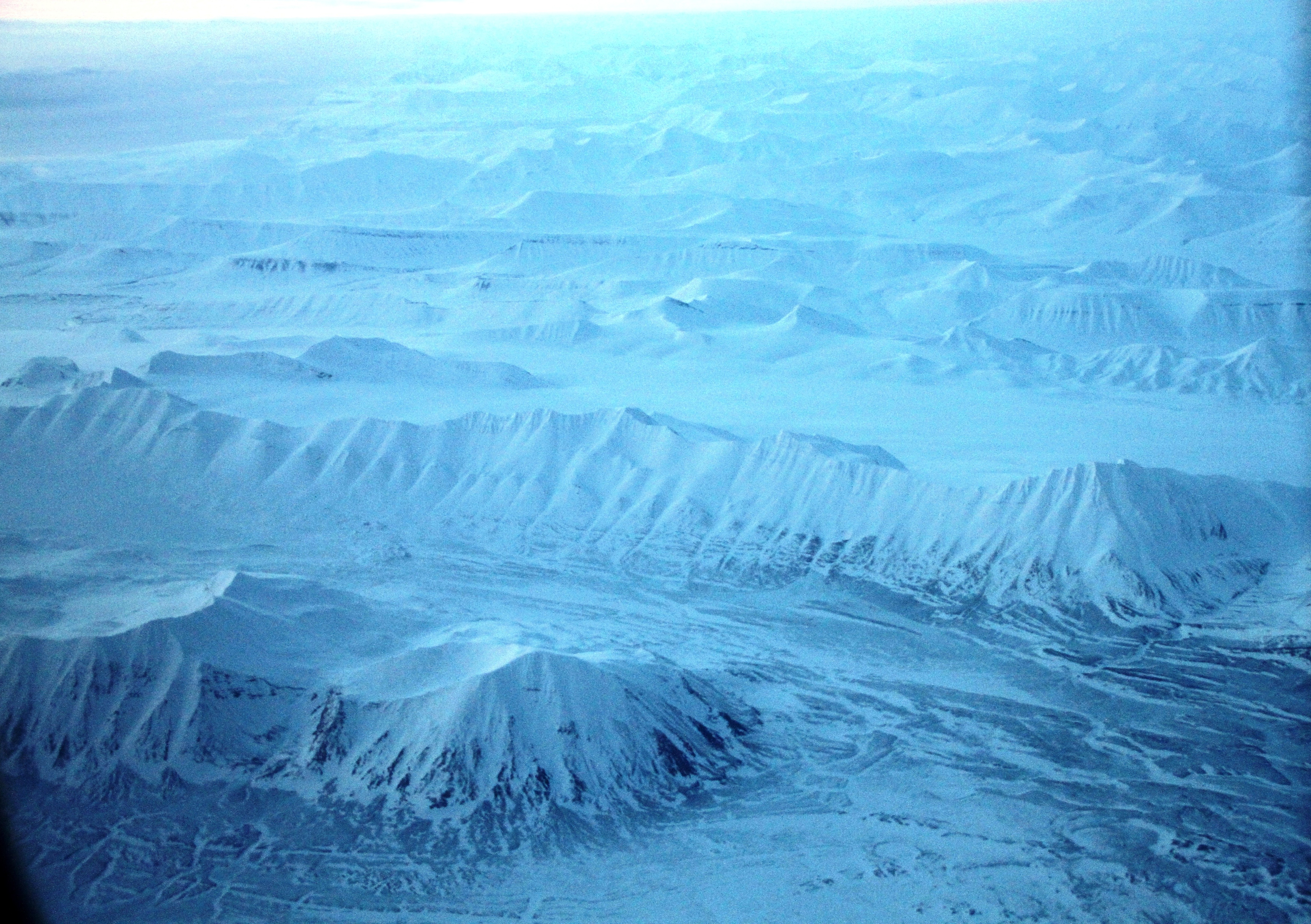
Ytterdalen and Fritjovbreen

Fridtjovbreen is a glacier in Nordenskiöld Land at Spitsbergen, Svalbard. It has a length of about 14 kilometers, and debouches into the bay Fridtjovhamna at the northern side of Van Mijenfjorden. The name stems from a hunting vessel used during the Torell expedition to Spitsbergen. The lower part of the glacier is included in the Nordenskiöld Land National Park.

To the west of Fridtjovbreen is the mountain Ingeborgfjellet, a characteristic ridge and an easily recognizable landmark viewed from sea.
