= Semmeldalselva =

River in Nordenskiöld Land, Spitsbergen, Svalbard

Coordinates: 77.9094°N 15.4163°E

Semmeldalselva is a river in Nordenskiöld Land at Spitsbergen, Svalbard. The river flows through the valley of Semmeldalen, and has a length of about fifteen kilometers. It starts as a continuation of Isbjørnelva where this river joins with a river from Skiferdalen. Semmeldalselva debouches into the bay of Kaldbukta, at the northern side of Van Mijenfjorden.
