= Bjørnsonfjellet =

Mountain in Spitsbergen, Norway

Coordinates: 78.0021°N 14.9693°E

Bjørnsonfjellet is a mountain in Nordenskiöld Land at Spitsbergen, Svalbard. It has a height of 932 m.a.s.l. and is part of Kolspissfjella. It is located north of Grøndalen. The mountain is named after Bjørnstjerne Bjørnson, recipient of the Nobel Prize in Literature.
