= Swedish settlement of Svalbard =

The Swedes have settled Svalbard since the turn of the 20th century. The Swedes played a significant role in the early exploration, mining, and scientific study of Svalbard. Swedish interest in the archipelago began with Arctic expeditions led by geologists and explorers such as Otto Martin Torell and Adolf Erik Nordenskiöld. In the early 20th century, Sweden established mining operations, most notably in Sveagruva and Pyramiden, before selling its claims to Norway and the Soviet Union.

== Background and early expeditions ==
During the second half of the 19th century, several Swedish polar expeditions were carried out, during which Svalbard and its largest island, Spitsbergen, were extensively studied. In addition to research on flora and fauna, geology studies were also conducted, primarily to locate mineral deposits and other natural resources.

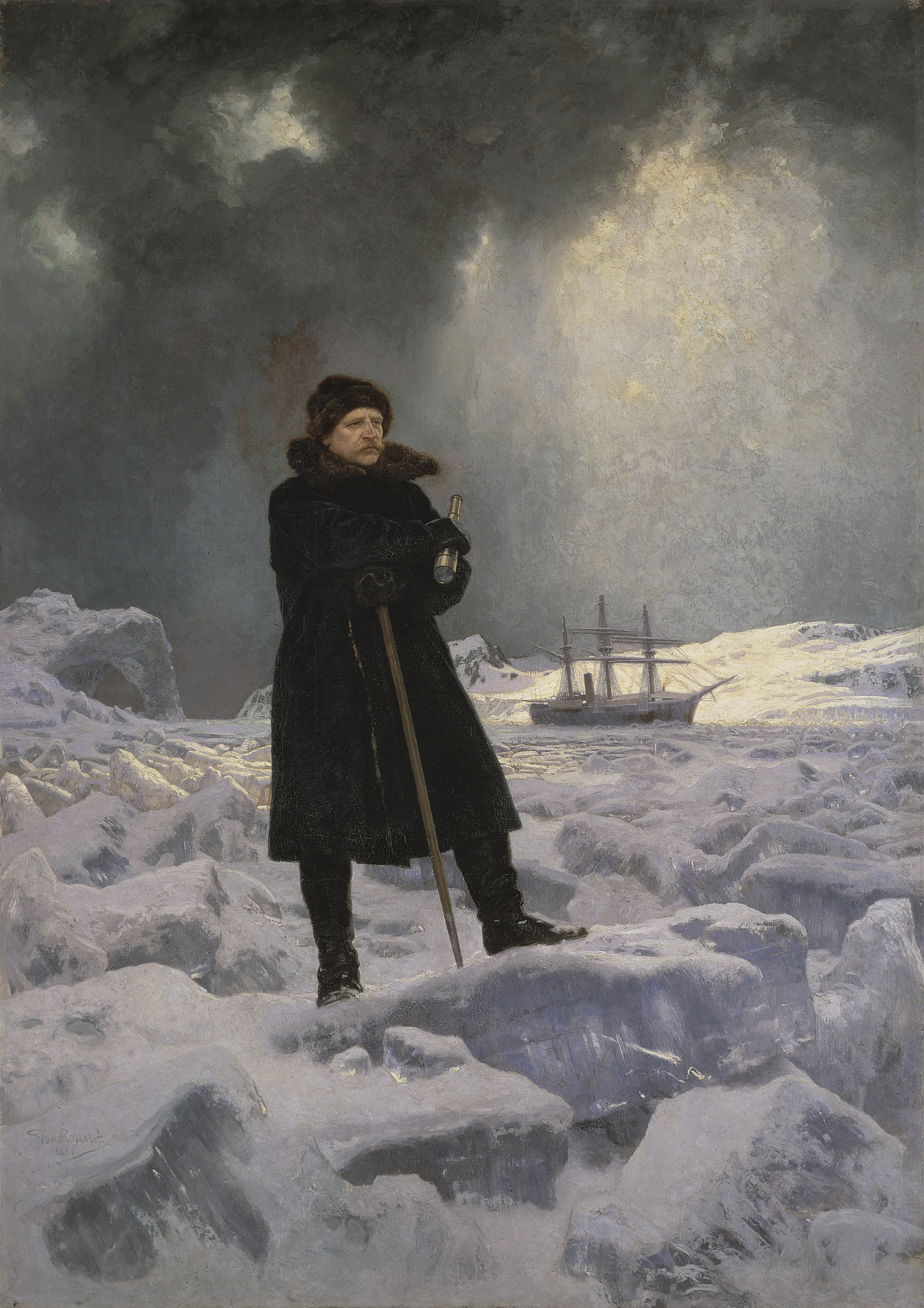
Nordenskiöld with the Vega Georg von Rosen (1886)

The first Swedish expedition to Svalbard was conducted in 1858 by Otto Martin Torell and Adolf Erik Nordenskiöld in the sloop Frithiof. The expedition made biological and geological observations along the coast of Spitsbergen.

Some later expeditions such as the Swedish–Russian Arc-of-Meridian Expedition, gave Swedish names to places in the archipelago such as Gustav V Land and Svenskøya.

=== Swedish Spitsbergen Expedition 1864 ===
In 1864 an expedition was conducted under the leadership of Nordenskiöld with the ship Axel Thordsen. The expedition had the purpose of exploring Spitsbergen and had three members of the research team: Nordenskiöld as leader, astronomer Nils Dunér and zoologist Anders Johan Malmgren.

The expedition left Tromsø early in the morning of 7 June 1864. On the way to Spitsbergen, the ship first stopped at Bjørnøya, which lies halfway between Tromsø and the southernmost part of Spitsbergen. Nordenskiöld then drew a map of the then relatively unknown island. This map was then used for 30 years, until an updated map was published in 1899 by Theodor Lerner. After a two-day stopover, the ship sailed on to Spitsbergen without major problems.

Once on Spitsbergen, Nordenskiöld and the other scientists set about collecting geological samples and surveying the mountains. The rest of the crew hunted reindeer and seals for provisions. The expedition relied heavily on hunting, especially reindeer hunting.

They returned to Tromsø on 13 September 1864.

== AB Isfjorden ==
AB Isfjorden was a Swedish company that was formed around 1870 to mine phosphorite found by Nordenskiöld and Oscar Dickson during his 1864 expedition to Cape Thordsen at Isfjorden on Spitsbergen in Svalbard.

A reconnaissance took place in 1872, in which, among others, the geologist Per Öberg participated. The project was canceled after it was deemed impossible to start profitable mining, especially when other phosphates began to enter the trade. Remaining from the project preparations was a two-story residential building built for the company at Cape Thordsen, which later became known as the "Swedish House". This was used as an expedition house for several Swedish polar expeditions.

AB Isfjorden's development plans were finally abandoned after Adolf Erik's son Gustaf Nordenskiöld mapped the area in the summer of 1890.

=== Svenskhuset ===
Svenskhuset (the Swedish House) is the oldest house on Spitsbergen. The house was erected by AB Isfjorden on Cape Thordsen, and was intended to withstand the harsh conditions of the Svalbard winters.

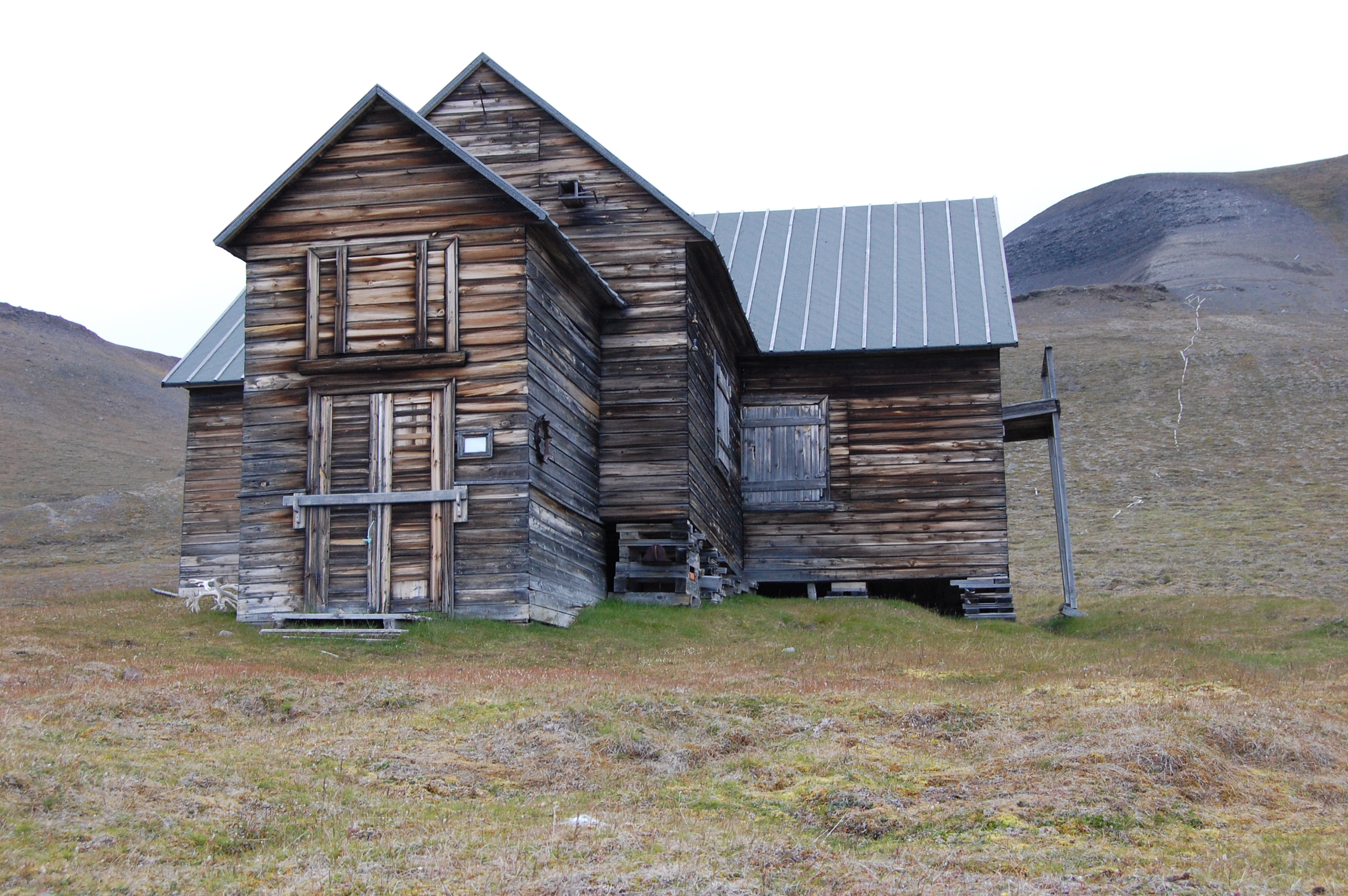
Svenskehuset in 2010

The house was built in 1872 on the initiative of Nordenskiöld as a first investment for a planned extraction of phosphorite, of which he himself was the initiator. He had discovered the phosphate deposit during the expedition in 1864. The house is located 700 meters from the beach on a plateau that is 30 meters above sea level. There were also stairs built in the cliff face and a railway for material transport between the landing site and the house.

A tragedy at Svenskhuset occurred in the winter of 1872–73 where seventeen men died in the house. The cause of death was long believed to be scurvy, but research done in 2008 has revealed that the men probably suffered lead poisoning.

Svenskehuset is today preserved as a cultural heritage site.

== Spetsbergens Svenska kolfält ==
AB Spetsbergens Svenska kolfält (after 1921 reform:Svenska stenkolsaktiebolaget Spetsbergen) was a Swedish mining company that operated between 1916 and 1926. The company founded Pyramiden and the Svea mine and operated coal mining.

=== Pyramiden ===
During his expedition in 1864, Nordenskiöld discovered phosphorite mineral at the mountain called Pyramiden in the interior of Isfjorden.

In January 1909, engineer Frans G. Stridsbergs at the Iron Office in Stockholm presented a plan to "occupy" that part of Svalbard (which at this point was considered Terra Nullius) for mining coal that would be used for the Swedish iron industry. The Iron Office contributed six thousand kronor and the proposal was supported with an equal amount by Trafikaktiebolaget Grängesberg-Oxelösund. After the Ministry of Foreign Affairs was notified, it was decided that an expedition would be ready by the summer of 1910. The five-man expedition, led by geology student Bertil Högbom, reached its destination on 12 July 1910 and an occupation sign declaring that this was Swedish land was erected. Since an American company had already found coal in the Adventdalen south of Pyramiden in 1906, it was decided that coal should also be searched for on the other side of the Nordenskiölds land, along the shores of the fjords Bellsund and Van Mijen. In early August, the expedition reached Braganza Bay in the interior of the Van Mijenfjorden and on August 16, the same day the expedition returned home, an occupation sign was erected at the site. In total, four areas were occupied by Sweden.

Back in Sweden, the mineral samples taken at the various sites were examined, which proved very promising. In addition to coal, rich deposits of gypsum were also found. However, there was a lack of money to start mining in Svalbard and the world market price of coal was too low for it to be profitable. In addition, state interests were not allowed to operate in Svalbard. The solution, initially, was to create the company AB Isfjorden-Bellsund, where the stakeholders behind Jernkontoret were guaranteed membership. The joint stock company was formed after an issue on 21 April 1911. The company equipped a new expedition, this time also led by Bertil Högbom, who arrived in Svalbard in the summer of 1911. During the next three summers, surveys and mining took place on a smaller scale in the various Swedish areas. After analyses, it was decided to focus on the deposit in Braganzavågen, which is why the mine in Pyramiden was abandoned and in 1927 was sold to The Soviet Union.

=== Svea ===
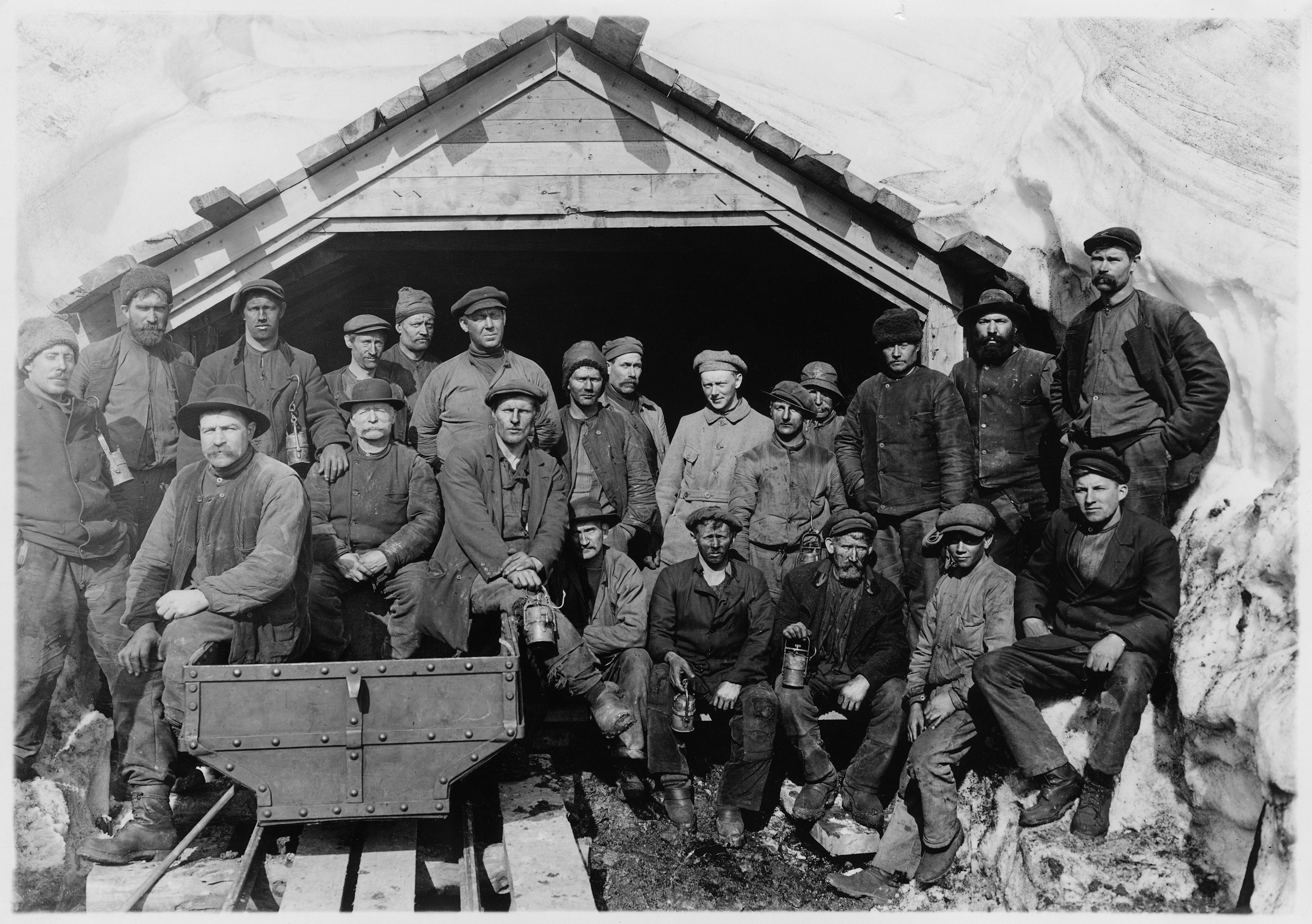
Workers in front of Svea's mine entrance in 1918

The interest in the new Joint-stock company was very high. In less than a week, all shares worth 2.5 million kronor had been sold out. The largest stakeholders were Jernkontoret, Trafik AB Grängesberg–Oxelösund and Sockerbolaget. The chairman was the Swedish envoy and disponent at Virsbo bruk Herman Lagercrantz, who was also chairman of the Swedish Trade Council. The mine in Braganza Bay was now called Svea, a name that was soon used for the entire small community that grew up. In the summer of 1917, about seventy coal workers from mainly Höganäs, Billesholm and Bjuv arrived in Svea. The economic crisis in Sweden was severe at this time and with a payment of one and a half to two times what was received in Sweden, it was not difficult to attract workers to the mine.

During the nine years that the mine was in operation, approximately two thousand Swedes - women and men - lived for longer or shorter periods in the occupied Swedish sector. During the long and dark winters, people worked in the mine and during the short summer, the coal was loaded and houses were built. The coal was loaded onto boats via a wooden pier over 100 meters long out into the fjord. For at least eight months of the year, the inhabitants of Svea were isolated from the outside world because of the ice, which meant that they could rarely stay there for less than a year. They often worked ten hours or more per day, which was driven by the company's encouragement of well-paid overtime work. On one occasion, however, a major strike led to all the workers going home, but on another occasion, when the syndicalist miners decided on a point strike, the workers immediately got their demands through, as the company did not want to lose important time. The number of wintering workers in Svea increased from 54 people in the winter of 1917–1918 to 201 in the winter of 1920-1921 and to 216 in the winter of 1924–1925. In the year 1924–1925, a whopping 116,000 tons were mined. During the period when the mine was in operation, it was issued a small newspaper in Svea and there was an amateur theater. The town was in wireless telegraphcontact with Boden.

A problem for the business was that materials and technology were not adapted to the harsh climate. For example, the coal was initially transported on rails with wagons, but after only a few months the rails were covered in snow, which is why a major investment was made in 1918 and cable cars were installed. Several of the buildings in the community of Svea were designed by architect Otar Hökerberg.

The Svalbard Treaty of 9 February 1920 granted Norway full sovereignty over Svalbard, although with two major limitations: all parties to the treaty had equal rights to economic resources and the archipelago was not to be used for "warlike purposes".

==== German raids ====
German raids of Swedish settlements in Svalbard
- Part of Atlantic U-boat campaign of World War I and Arctic naval operations of World War II
Date	1916–1945
Location	Spitsbergen, Svalbard

Belligerents
German Empire (1916–1918) Nazi Germany (1940–1945)	Sweden; Supported by: Free Norway

Commanders and leaders
(German Empire) Reinhard Scheer (Nazi Germany) Erich Etienne † (Nazi Germany) Friedrich-Georg Herrle	(Sweden) Herman Lagercrantz (Norway) Lt. Ove Roll Lund

Units involved
Imperial German Navy (Nazi Germany) 13th U-boat Flotilla (Nazi Germany) Svalbard garrison	(Sweden) Spetsbergens Svenska kolfält (Norway) SNSK

In 1916, two years after World War I started, the Germans proclaimed their unconditional submarine warfare, which sent coal prices soaring by over a thousand percent. Now the situation had arrived as expected; a threatening "energy crisis" with promising profitability gave the coal barons momentum and the starting signal was given for a massive exploitation of the occupied areas. The Braganza wave now appeared more like a gold mine than a coal mine.

The journey in the summer of 1917 was by no means problem-free, there was great concern about German submarines, and paradoxically, it was difficult to get away because the coal shortage during the war made it complicated to get hold of fuel for the boats. However, it had not been a problem for the company to recruit workers to the remote and inhospitable Spitsbergen. The crisis was severe in Sweden in 1917, famine threatened, and with a payment of one and a half to two times what was received in Sweden, it was not difficult to attract a one-year contract in Svea.

On 9 April 1940 Nazi Germany invaded and occupied Norway and by extension also Svalbard. Spitsbergen was initially unaffected by the Germans until the German attack on the Soviet Union, Svalbard became of strategic importance to secure supplies between the Allies.

In 1941 Norwegian and Soviet coal mines were evacuated and destroyed during Operation Gauntlet, leaving Svea isolated both from Sweden and the rest of Svalbard.

On 18 May 1942, as a part of Operation Fritham, governor and Lieutenant Ove Roll Lund sent 35 men to Svea to prevent the Germans from taking the mine and its resources.

In August 1944, The German submarine U-307 surfaced and shelled all the barracks and other buildings, which burned to the ground. It is because of this event that very few buildings from the Swedish occupation still stands to this day. However, the foundations still remain, a cable car station and a number of mine shafts remain from the Swedish era.

==== Reform and sale ====
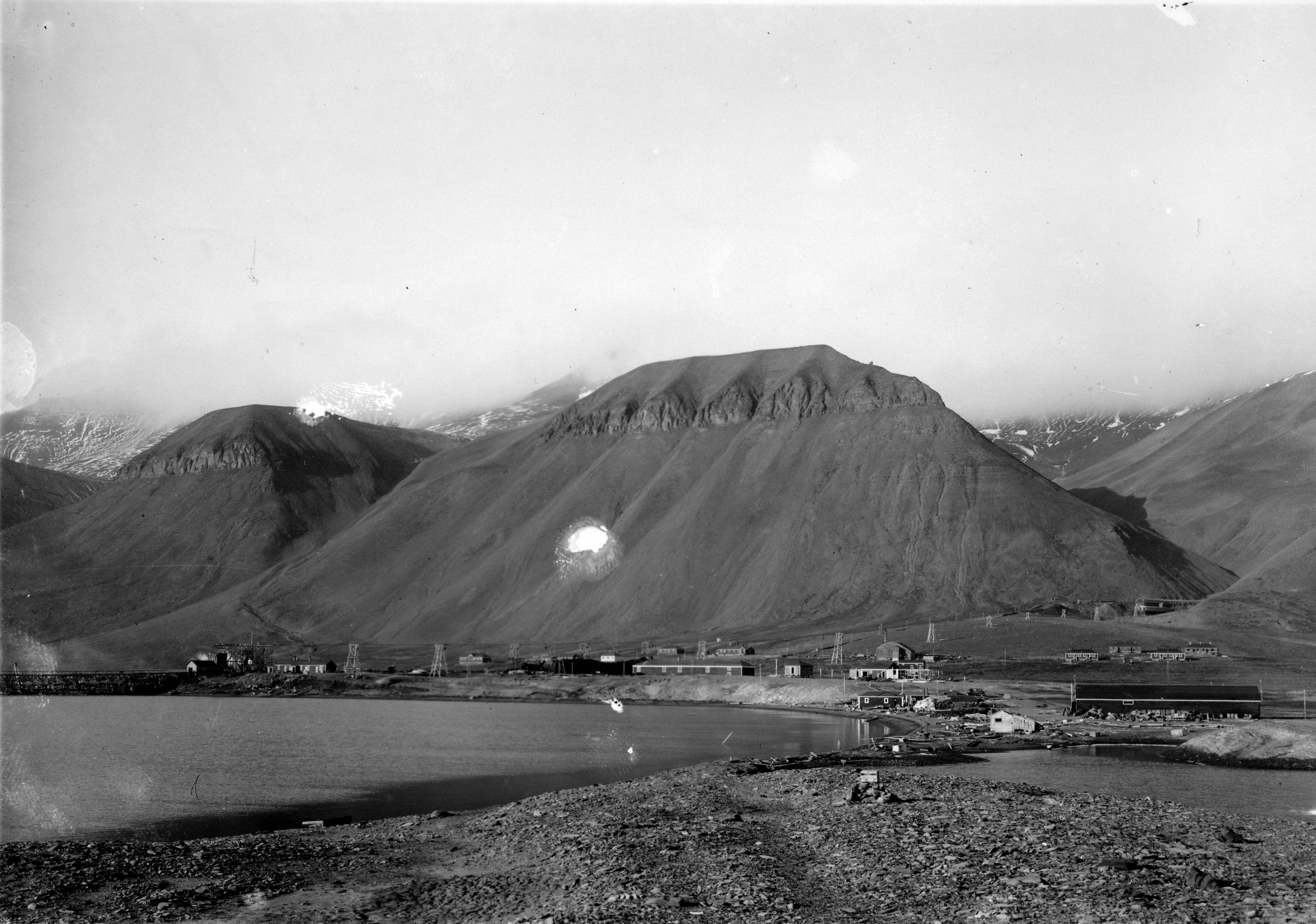
Overview of Svea, mid 1919

Around 1920, mining in Svea flourished, when up to six hundred workers were employed, many on two- or three-year contracts. The mine's high-quality coal was considered so important for Sweden's economic independence that in 1921, through a reconstruction of AB Spetsbergens Svenska kolfält, the Kommerskollegium initiated the new company Svenska Stenkolsaktiebolaget Spetsbergen, with a share capital of 5 million kronor, in which the Swedish state had a majority. By this time, mining had increased from 3 500 tons in 1916–1917 to 52 000 tons in 1920–1921. In the year 1924–1925, a full 116 000 tons were mined. In 1924, a total of 420 000 tons of coal were exported by the six different mining companies operating on Spitsbergen, with the others being operated by Norwegian, English, Dutch and Russian companies.

The main buyer of the coal from Svea was Statens Järnvägar, but with the increased electrification of the railways, the need decreased. At the same time, international coal prices fell, which affected wages. Criticism of the state's involvement in Svea was fierce, and the closure of the mine was debated. On May 12, 1925, a major fire broke out in the mine, which put an end to all operations. In 1926, the company went into liquidation, but it was reconstructed two years later under the name Nya svenska stenkolsaktiebolaget Spetsbergen, where the Swedish state was almost the sole shareholder. The operations were limited to guarding and repair work, until Svea was sold to the Norwegian coal company Store Norske Spitsbergen Kulkompani on March 14, 1934, for one million kronor. The decision was hammered through in the Swedish Parliament by a majority of one vote.

== See also ==
- History of Svalbard
- Swedish overseas colonies
- Terra nullius
