= Hollendardalen =

Valley of Spitsbergen, Norway

Coordinates: 78.0582°N 14.5816°E

Hollendardalen is a valley in Nordenskiöld Land at Spitsbergen, Svalbard. The valley has a length of about sixteen kilometers, extending from Passfjellbreen to Isfjorden. Hollendarelva flows through the valley from Passfjordbreen, ending in Hollendarbukta. The mountain range Kolspissfjella is located south of the valley, and Kjeglefjella at the northern side.
