= Dominions of Sweden =

Territories under the control of Sweden

The Swedish Empire following the Treaty of Roskilde of 1658.

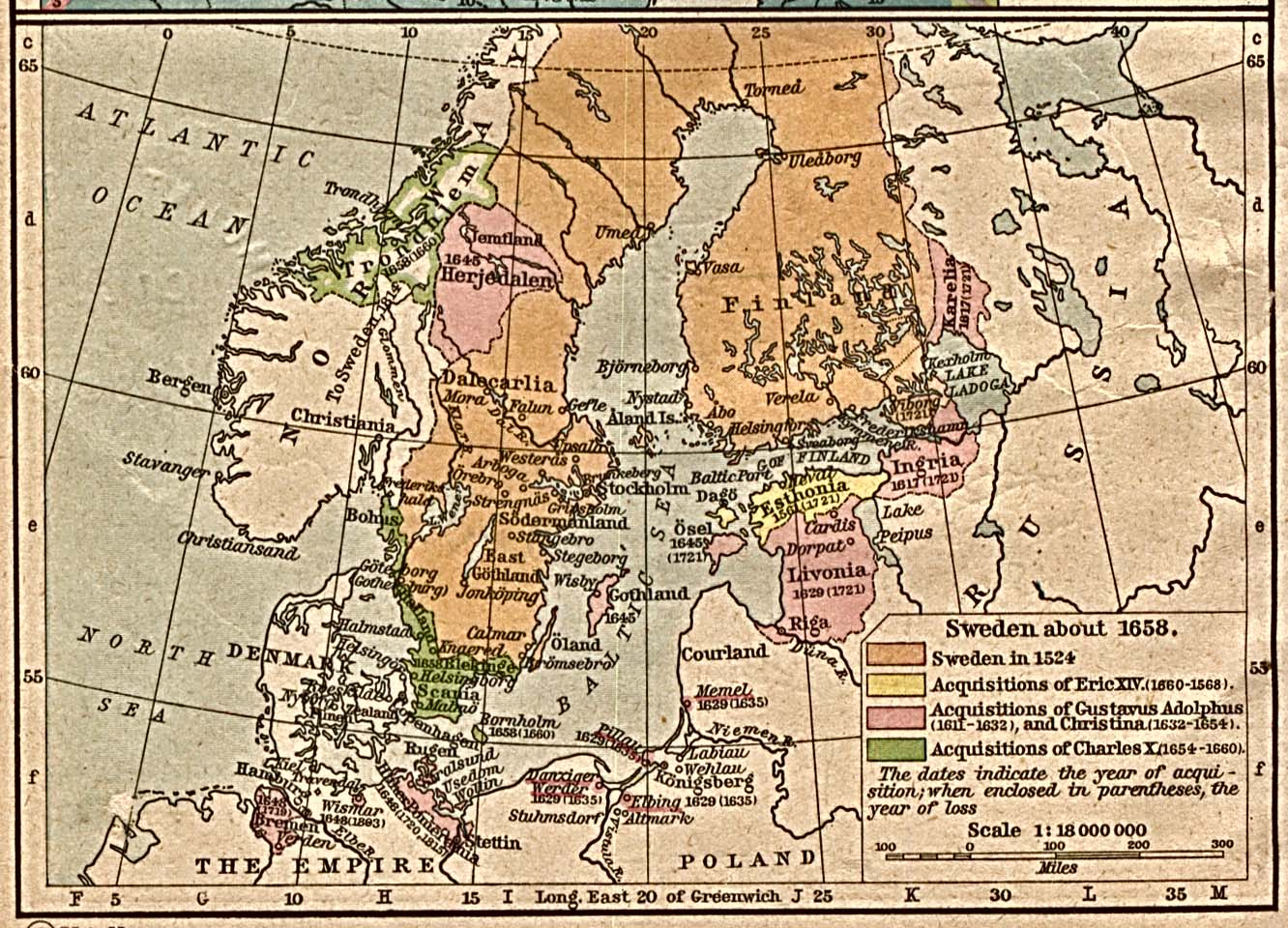
Swedish possessions in 1658. The year in parentheses is the year the possession was given up or lost.

The Dominions of Sweden or Svenska besittningar ("Swedish possessions") were territories that historically came under control of the Swedish Crown, but never became fully integrated with Sweden. This generally meant that they were ruled by Governors-General under the Swedish monarch, but within certain limits retained their own established political systems, essentially their diets. Finland was not a dominion, but a land of Sweden. The dominions had no representation in the Swedish Riksdag as stipulated by the 1634 Instrument of Government paragraph 46: "No one, who is not living inside the separate and old borders of Sweden and Finland, have anything to say at Riksdags and other meetings..."

== Baltic Dominions ==
Between 1561 and 1629 Sweden made conquests in the Eastern Baltic. All of them were lost in accordance with the Treaty of Nystad in 1721, which concluded the Great Northern War.

=== Estonia ===
Estonia placed itself under Swedish rule in 1561 to receive protection against Russia and Poland as the Livonian Order lost their foothold in the Baltic provinces. Territorially it represented the northern part of present-day Estonia.

The area was significantly populated by Estonian Swedes, who inhabited the area for centuries after Sweden lost control of it. After the Soviet Union's Baltic offensive and re-occupation of Estonia in 1944, nearly all the Estonian Swedes fled to Sweden proper.

=== Kexholm ===
Kexholm was a sparsely inhabited part of Karelia on the Western and Northern shores of Lake Ladoga, annexed by Sweden in 1605. At that time, most inhabitants were Finnish-speaking Orthodox Christians. During the 17th century, Lutheran persecution of Orthodox Christianity and an influx of Lutheran Finns from neighbouring province of Savonia converted most of the area into Lutheran faith. The Swedish law and the Swedish structure of local administration were used in the area which does not seem to have had any prior written legal tradition. Nowadays the county is divided between Finnish regions of North Karelia and South Karelia and the Russian Republic of Karelia.

=== Ingria ===
Russia ceded Ingria and southern Karelia to Sweden in the Treaty of Stolbovo in 1617, following the Ingrian War. A century later Russia reconquered the area, providing an opportunity for Peter the Great to lay the foundations of his new capital, Saint Petersburg, in 1703. The area was then formally ceded in 1721 by the Treaty of Nystad.

=== Riga ===
The Hanseatic city of Riga fell under Swedish control in the late 1620s. For the nearly hundred years that followed, Riga was the second largest city in the Swedish Empire, after Stockholm.

=== Livonia ===
Livonia was conquered from the Polish–Lithuanian Commonwealth by 1629 in the Polish-Swedish War. By the Treaty of Oliva between the Commonwealth and Sweden in 1660 following the Northern Wars the Polish-Lithuanian king renounced all claims to the Swedish throne and Livonia was formally ceded to Sweden. Swedish Livonia represents the southern part of present-day Estonia and the northern part of present-day Latvia (Vidzeme region).

=== Lithuania ===
During the Second Northern War, Lithuanian nobility signed a series of acts with the Swedish Empire and became its protectorate in 1655 with King Charles X Gustav serving as its Grand Duke. However, following Sweden's defeat at the Battle of Prostki and weak military presence in the region, the protectorate fell in 1657 and Lithuania was once again reincorporated into the Polish–Lithuanian Commonwealth.

=== Ösel ===
By the Treaty of Brömsebro (1645), following the Torstenson War, Denmark-Norway ceded Jämtland, Härjedalen, Idre & Särna, Gotland, Halland and Ösel to Sweden. Ösel and Dagö, islands off the coast of Estonia, were ceded to Russia in 1721 by the Treaty of Nystad. The other territories remained part of Sweden.

== Scanian Dominion ==
By the peace treaties of Brömsebro (1645) and Roskilde (1658) the Realm of Sweden expanded to the south. Blekinge, Bohuslän (of Norway), Halland and Scania were ceded by Denmark in the latter and then successfully defended in the Scanian War (1675–1679). According to the peace treaties the provinces were to retain its old laws and privileges, and was initially administered as a dominion. A gradual process of incorporation was successfully concluded in 1721.

== Continental Dominions ==
Through its minor German principalities, the Swedish kings in their roles as princes and dukes, or Reichsfürsten, of the Holy Roman Empire with Imperial immediacy took part in the German diets from 1648 until the dissolution of the Holy Roman Empire in 1806.

=== Bremen and Verden ===
Following the Thirty Years' War, the Peace of Westphalia in 1648 assigned to Sweden the two bishoprics of Bremen-Verden, with the exclave of Wildeshausen. All of them were ceded to Hanover in the peace treaty of 1719.

=== Pomerania ===
By the Peace of Westphalia in 1648 Sweden received Swedish Pomerania, situated along the German Baltic Sea coast. The whole Duchy of Pomerania was under Swedish control already since the Treaty of Stettin (1630), and in the Treaty of Stettin (1653) Sweden and Brandenburg agreed on the final terms of the partition of the duchy, with Sweden keeping the western part (Western Pomerania, Vorpommern) including Stettin. In 1720 the southern parts of Swedish Pomerania with the town of Stettin and the islands of Usedom and Wollin were ceded to the Kingdom of Prussia, following the Great Northern War. The capital was moved to Greifswald. In 1814 the remainder, with the town of Stralsund and the island of Rügen was ceded to Denmark, which in exchange ceded Norway to the king of Sweden under the Treaty of Kiel, which followed on War of the Sixth Coalition. However the treaty of Kiel never came into force: instead sovereignty of Western Pomerania passed to Kingdom of Prussia, which already held the eastern parts and merged them into the Province of Pomerania. Norway declared its independence, but was forced after a short war into a personal Union with Sweden.

=== Wismar ===
Sweden received the German town of Wismar with the surrounding countryside in the Peace of Westphalia (1648). In 1803 Wismar was pawned, in exchange for a loan, and control was handed over to Mecklenburg. The loan defaulted in 1903, but Sweden rescinded its right to regain control of the German exclave and thereby nominally received its present territorial constitution.

== See also ==
- Provinces of Sweden
- Political unions involving Sweden
- List of wars involving Sweden
- Possessions of Sweden
