= Tavlebreen =

Glacier in Svalbard, Norway

Coordinates: 77.9606°N 15.0962°E

Tavlebreen (The Slate Glacier) is a glacier in Nordenskiöld Land at Spitsbergen, Svalbard. The glacier is located between Sinaiberget and Lagerlöfhøgda, flowing from Lovberget towards Passdalen. It has a length of about five kilometers.
