= Reindalspasset =

Coordinates: 78°03′24″N 16°55′18″E

Reindalspasset is a mountain pass in Nordenskiöld Land at Spitsbergen, Svalbard. It separates the 38 kilometer long valley of Reindalen from the 14 kilometer long valley Lundströmdalen.
