= Reindalen =

Valley of Spitsbergen, Norway

Coordinates: 77.9462°N 15.8227°E

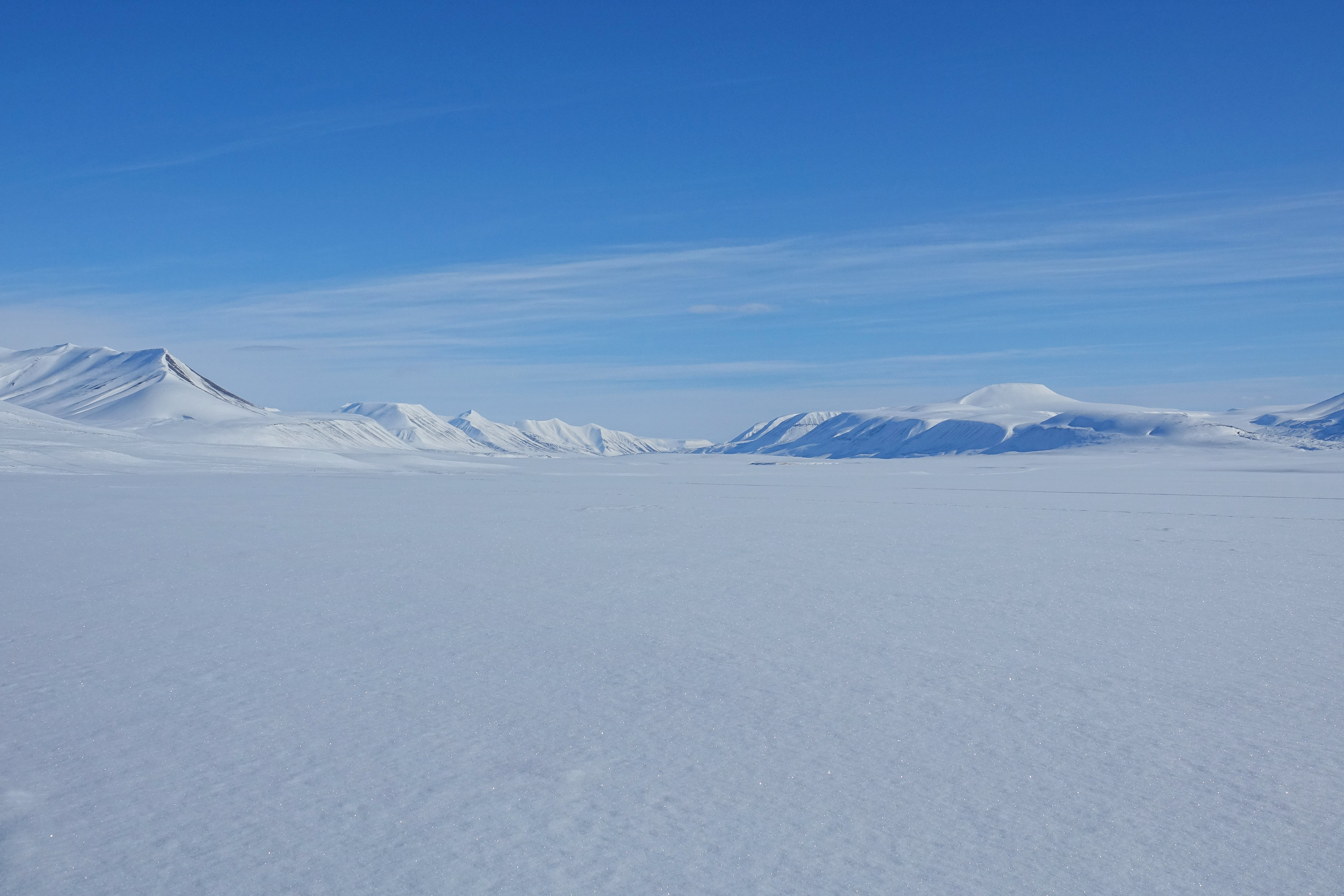
The north-eastern part of Reindalen, seen from where Gangdalen enters Reindalen from the north.

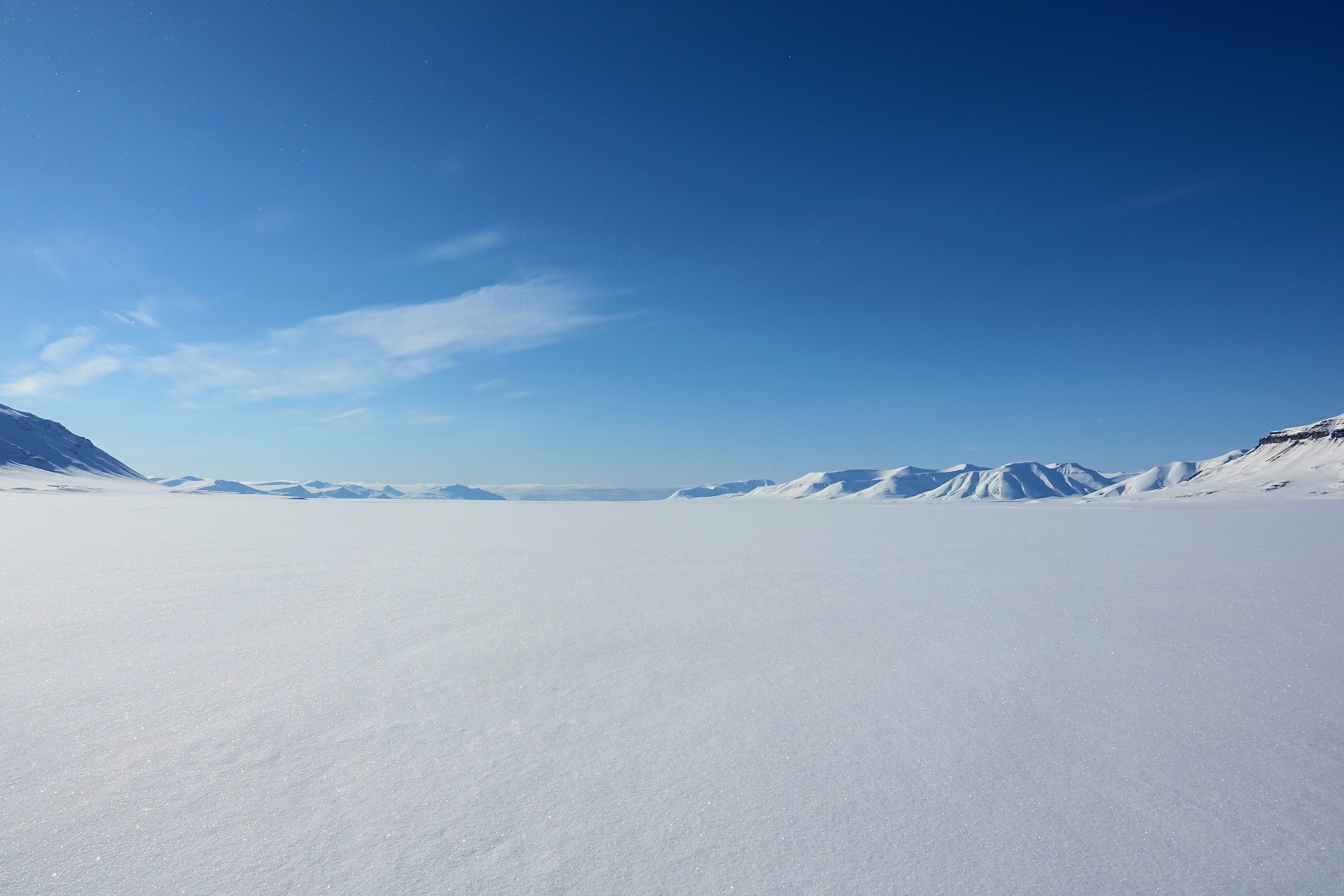
The south-western part of Reindalen, seen from where Gangdalen enters Reindalen from the north.

Reindalen is a valley in Nordenskiöld Land at Spitsbergen, Svalbard. It has a length of about 38 kilometers. The valley stretches westwards from the mountain pass Reindalspasset, and debouches into Van Mijenfjorden, in the bay of Kaldbukta at the northern side of the fjord. The river Reindalselva flows through the valley, and has formed a river delta where it dobouches into the fjord. Reindalen is the largest ice free valley of Svalbard, and is included in the Nordenskiöld Land National Park.
