= Lågnesflya =

Coastal plain of Spitsbergen, Norway

Coordinates: 77.82°N 13.96°E

Lågnesflya is a coastal plain in Nordenskiöld Land at Spitsbergen, Svalbard. It is located between the lakes of Femvatna and Andungen in the north and Ytterdalselva in the southeast, the bays of Van Muydenbukta and Marvågen, and the hills of Lågnesrabbane. The pyramid shaped landmark of Ytterdalsgubben is located between Lågnesflya and the glacier of Erdmannbreen.
