= Political unions involving Sweden =

Sweden has for political and dynastic reasons been in union with other kingdoms and princely states, ostensibly personal unions.

== Norway (I) ==
In 1319 the infant Magnus Eriksson was crowned as king of both Sweden and Norway (which included Iceland and Greenland). In 1332 Scania, Blekinge and Ven were sold to Magnus from Duke Johan of Holstein, after the local population expressed dissatisfaction with Duke Johan and stated they would rather be ruled by the Swedes. The Duke started negotiations with the Swedes and it was agreed that the Swedish king would redeem the pledge for 34,000 marks of silver (6 432 kilo). When the Danish king refused to recognise King Magnus's ownership of Skåneland, Magnus turned to the Pope, requesting confirmation of the purchase but received only evasive answers. Mainly as a result of his mother's lien on certain castles in Denmark, Magnus waged war with King Valdemar. Peace between them was only concluded in the autumn of 1343 in Varberg, when Valdemar formally renounced all claims to Scania, Blekinge and Halland. The union of these two countries lasted until 1343 when Magnus preemptively let his son Haakon succeed him to the Norwegian throne, though he would still rule as regent during his son's minority, which ended in 1355, when Haakon came of age. In 1360 the Danish king Valdemar Atterdag reconquered Skåneland.

== Mecklenburg-Schwerin ==
In 1384 Albrekt of Mecklenburg (ca 1338-1412) was king of Sweden 1363-1389 and Duke of Mecklenburg-Schwerin 1384-1412. Briefly forming a personal union in 1384 to 1389.

== Kalmar Union ==
In 1397 the three Scandinavian kingdoms of Sweden, Norway and Denmark were united in the Kalmar Union, a personal union agreed upon in the Swedish city of Kalmar. After only a few decades the relationship between Sweden and the leading power Denmark had deteriorated into open conflict. The period until the dissolution in 1521 was marked by the constant strife between Sweden and Denmark. The union was sometimes made defunct by Sweden electing a monarch separate from the union king, and on one occasion Sweden and Norway were even de facto united in a personal union in opposition to the union monarch.

== Poland-Lithuania ==
In 1592 Sigismund succeeded his father John III of Sweden to the Swedish throne, but after the Polish election in 1587 and confirmation of GDL Natural and legal rights in 1588 he had also been elected king of Poland–Lithuania making him the monarch of both nations. Sigismund, who was a Roman Catholic failed however to gain support in Lutheran Sweden, and was eventually deposed and succeeded by his uncle Charles IX in Sweden 1599.

== Palatine Zweibrücken ==
In 1654, Christina abdicated and was succeeded by her cousin Charles X, Duke of Palatine Zweibrücken. Sweden and Zweibrücken were also united under Charles XI and Charles XII, until the death of the latter in 1718, at which point he was succeeded by his sister Ulrike Eleonora on the Swedish throne, but not in his German Duchy.

== Grand Duchy of Lithuania ==
In 1655, Lithuania and Sweden signed the Treaty and Union of Kėdainiai. This personal union de facto established Lithuania as Sweden's protectorate with Charles X Gustav serving as its Grand Duke of Lithuania. Following Sweden's defeat in the Second Northern War, the protectorate was terminated in 1657.

== Hesse-Kassel ==
Frederick I of Sweden had acceded to the Swedish throne when his wife, Ulrike Eleonora, abdicated in his favour in 1721. In 1730 he was also in line of succession to the duchy of Hesse-Kassel, which resulted in a personal union that lasted until his death in 1751.

== Norway (II) ==
By the Treaty of Kiel in 1814 the king of Denmark-Norway ceded Norway to the king of Sweden, an event which likely would have resulted in a full political union between Sweden and Norway. The treaty however never came into force, as Norway adopted a constitution and declared independence. Sweden, which would not accept this outcome, went to war and forced Norway into accepting a personal union with Sweden. The two kingdoms had full inner autonomy and separate institutions, sharing only the monarch and the foreign policy, which was conducted by the Swedish foreign office.

== European Union ==
In 1995 Sweden joined the European Union after holding a referendum on the matter. The European Union at present constitutes 27 European states. The organisation is a political union where each state is technically allowed to conduct their own foreign policy (though a loose joint policy is in place).

== Table ==
Year	Unions		Lasted
—	Sweden	–	Antiquity
1319	Sweden	Norway	36 years
1355	Sweden	–	29 years
1384	Sweden	Mecklenburg-Schwerin	5 years
1389	Sweden	–	8 years
1397	Sweden	Denmark and Norway	124 years
1521	Sweden	–	71 years
1592	Sweden	Poland–Lithuania	7 years
1599	Sweden	–	55 years
1654	Sweden	Palatine Zweibrücken	64 years
1718	Sweden	–	12 years
1730	Sweden	Hesse-Kassel	21 years
1751	Sweden	–	63 years
1814	Sweden	Norway	91 years
1905	Sweden	–	90 years
1995	Sweden	European Union	31 years

== See also ==
- Sweden
- List of Swedish monarchs
