= Van Muydenbukta =

Bay in Svalbard, Norway

Coordinates: 77°45.7′N 14°09′E

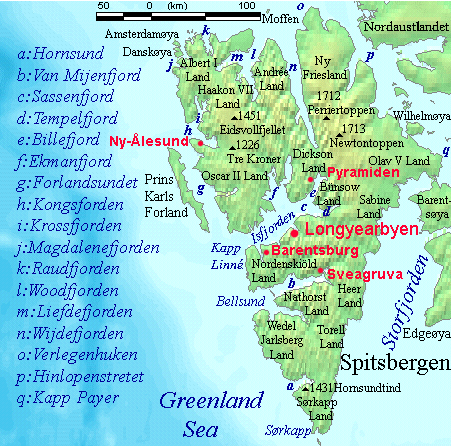
Van Muydenbukta lies on the northern side of Bellsund on Spitsbergen's west coast.

Van Muydenbukta is a large, open bay on the northern side of Bellsund, on the west coast of Spitsbergen. It is named after the Dutchman Willem Cornelisz. van Muyden, commander of the Dutch whaling fleet in 1612 and 1613.
