= Grøndalen =

Valley of Spitsbergen, Norway

Coordinates: 77.9964°N 14.6473°E

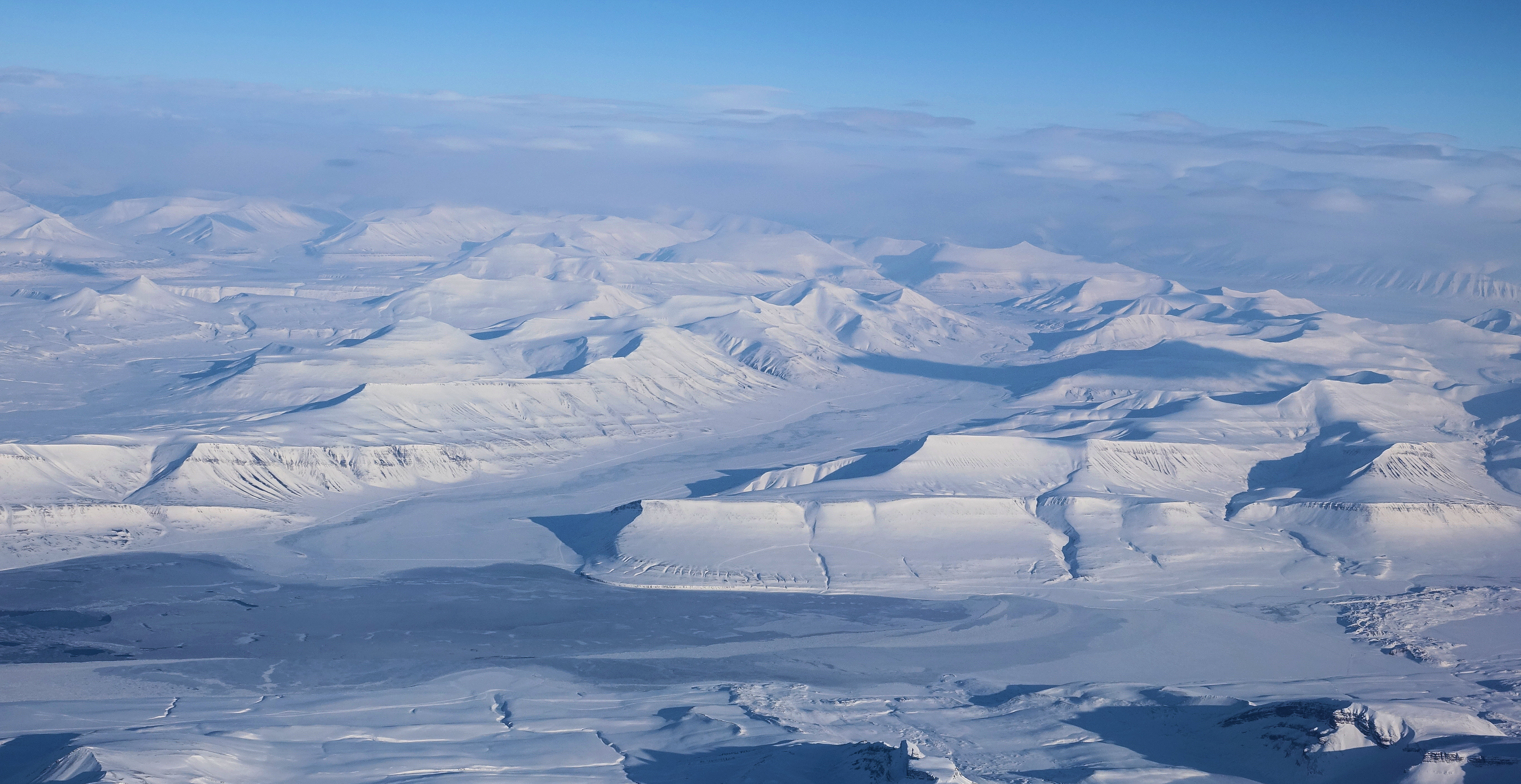
Grøndalen seen from west, with Grønfjorden in the foreground.

Grøndalen is a valley in Nordenskiöld Land at Spitsbergen, Svalbard. It has a length of about 19 kilometers. The valley stretches westwards from the mountain pass Grøndalspasset, and debouches into Grønfjorden, at the eastern side of the fjord. The river Grøndalselva flows through the valley.
