= Nordenskiöld Land National Park =

National park in Norway

- IUCN category II (national park)

- Interactive map of Nordenskiöld Land National Park
- Location: Spitsbergen, Svalbard, Norway
- Nearest city: Longyearbyen
- Coordinates: 77°52′N 15°19′E
- Area: 1,362 km^{2} (526 sq mi)
- Established: 2003
- Governing body: Directorate for Nature Management

Ramsar Wetland
- Official name: Nordenskiöldkysten
- Designated: 11 December 2010
- Reference no.: 1968

Nordenskiöld Land National Park (Norwegian: Nordenskiöld Land nasjonalpark), also known as Nordenskjøld Land National Park, is a national park in Spitsbergen island in the Svalbard archipelago, Norway.

Opened in 2003, the park covers the southern part of Nordenskiöld Land, on the north shore of Van Mijenfjorden. The park includes Reindalen, which is Svalbard's largest ice-free valley and features moraines, rock glaciers, pingos and avalanche features. The valley has lush vegetation and the lower part is a wetland. The area is important for reindeer, Arctic fox, waders, geese and ducks.
