= Nordenskiöld Land =

Land area on Spitsbergen, Svalbard, Norway

Coordinates: 78°03′N 15°32′E

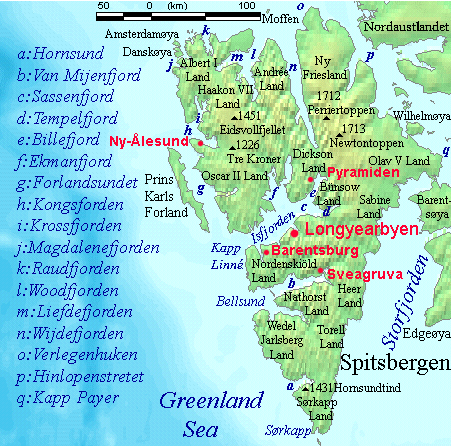
Nordenskiöld Land is located on the western side of Spitsbergen, between Isfjorden and Bellsund.

Nordenskiöld Land is the land area between Isfjorden and Van Mijenfjorden on Spitsbergen, Svalbard. The area is named after Finnish-Swedish explorer and geologist Nils Adolf Erik Nordenskiöld. The coastal region of Nordenskiöld Land (Nordenskiøldkysten) has been identified as an Important Bird Area (IBA) by BirdLife International because it supports breeding populations of barnacle geese and common eiders.
