= Convers Avia Flight 312 =

2017 aviation accident in Norway

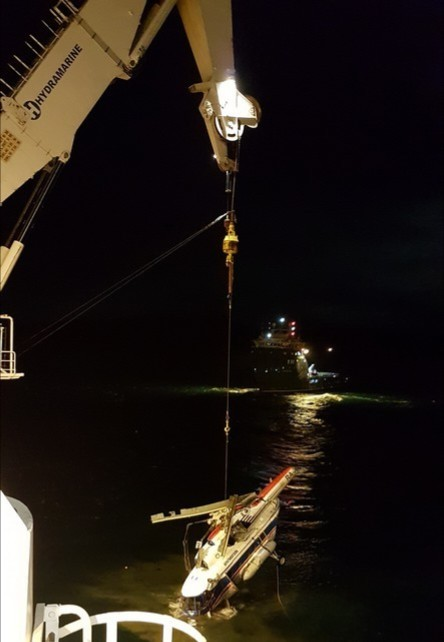
- Wreckage of helicopter

Accident
- Date: 26 October 2017
- Summary: Spatial disorientation caused by bad weather
- Site: Isfjorden north off the coast of Barentsburg, Svalbard, Norway; 78°06′38.5″N 14°12′52.8″E

Aircraft
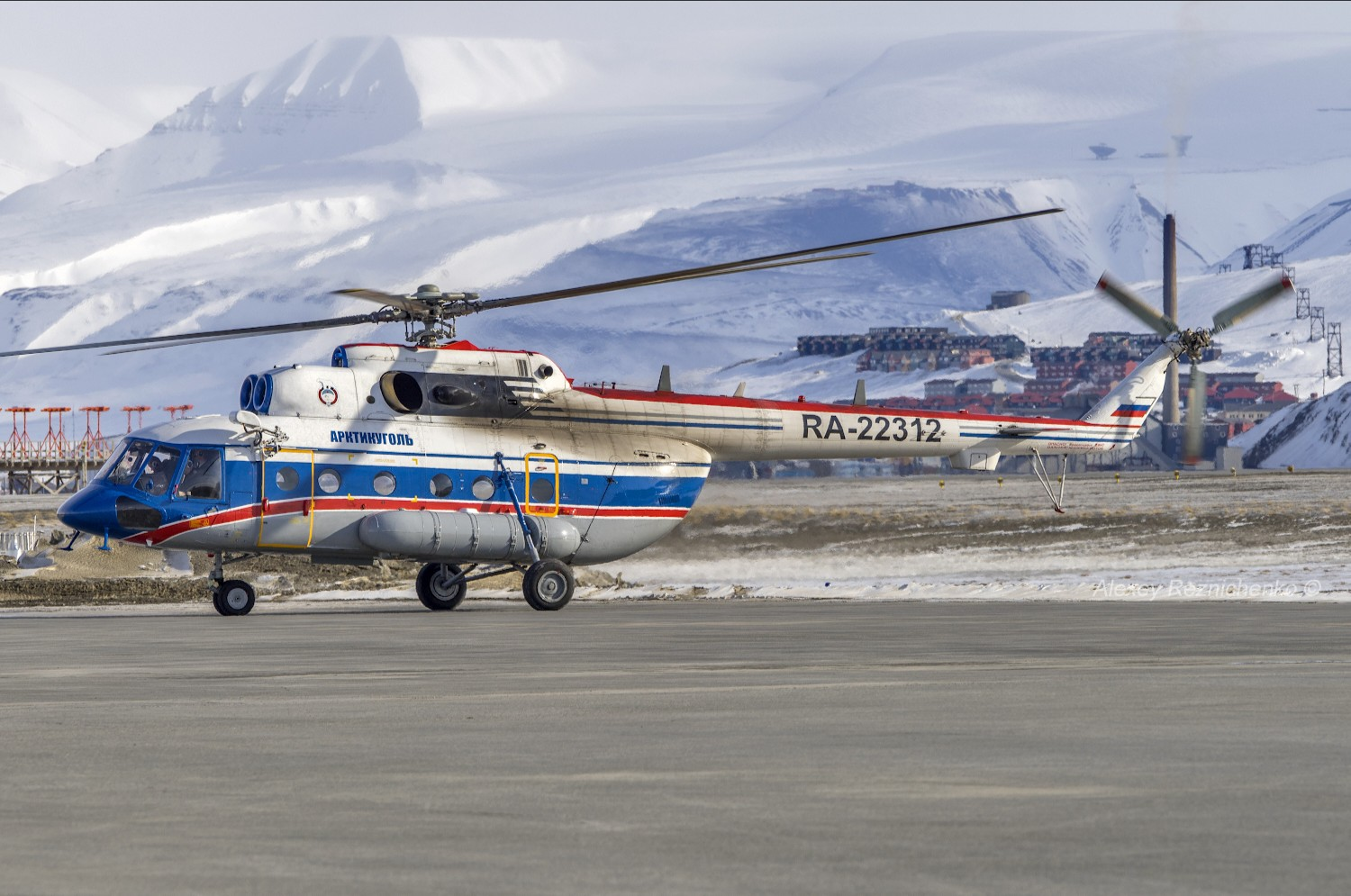
- RA-22312, helicopter involved in the accident
- Aircraft type: Mil Mi-8AMT
- Operator: Convers Avia
- ICAO flight No.: CVS312
- Registration: RA-22312
- Flight origin: Pyramiden Heliport, Pyramiden, Norway
- Destination: Barentsburg Heliport, Barentsburg, Norway
- Occupants: 8
- Passengers: 5
- Crew: 3
- Fatalities: 8
- Survivors: 0

On 26 October 2017, Convers Avia Flight 312, a Mil Mi-8 helicopter operating a flight from Pyramiden Heliport to Barentsburg Heliport, in the Svalbard archipelago, Norway, crashed into the water of Isfjorden fjord, just north of the settlement of Barentsburg. All eight occupants of the aircraft were killed. The investigation on the crash found out that the accident was caused by spatial disorientation, which led the crew to lose their visual references.

== Background ==
=== Aircraft ===
The aircraft involved was a russian-registered Mil Mi-8AMT, with tail number RA-22312, and manufactured in 2013. The aircraft was delivered to Convers Avia in 2014.

=== Crew and passengers ===
The male captain was 43 years old, he was hired by Convers Avia in 2010 firstly as a Mil Mi-8 first officer, and then he became a commander in 2014. He made his last certification test sixteen days before the accident. He had a total of 8265 flight hours, of which 114 in the Mil Mi-8.

The male first officer was 39 year old, he was hired by Convers Avia six month prior to the accident. He had a total of 3790 flight hours of which 1646 were on the Mil Mi-8.

The male flight engineer was 39 years old, he received his flight engineer certificate in 2005 and he was hired by Convers Avia in 2016. He received his last checkings twenty-one days before the crash. He had a total of 4413 flight hours, of which 59 on this aircraft type.

On board there were also five passengers, all members of the Arktikugol mining company.

== Accident ==
The aircraft took off from Pyramiden Heliport for a flight across the Isfjorden fjord carrying mining workers to Barentsburg Heliport. The last contact with the aircraft was recorded at 3:06 pm local time, when it was flying over the water. Weather at the time was rough, with visibility reported to be under one kilometer horizontally and less than one hundred meters vertically, heavy ongoing snowing and strong winds. The conditions were under the minimal required by the airline, but the flight was continued nonetheless. At 3:08 pm the helicopter impacted the sea surface and crashed.

Immediately after the aircraft went missing a joint search between norwegian and russian authorities was started. The Governor of Svalbard's ship Polarsyssel, coast guard's vessel NoCGV Barentshav, AUV Hugin and multiple helicopters and planes took part in the search. After three days of search the helicopter's wreckage was found at a depth of 209 meters. On 4 November the Mil Mi-8 flight data recorder and GPS systems were recovered. Of the bodies of the eight occupants only one was found about 150 meters from the aircraft wreckage. All the victims probably died by drowning or hypothermia, and the fact that the helicopter was not equipped with rafts or lifevests probably contributed to the fact that there were no survivors.

== Investigation ==
The helicopter wreckage was recovered by the Maersk Forza ship on November 4, and was later brought to AIBN structures for the investigation. The final report published in 2020 by the norwegian AIBN found out that the cause of the accident was a loss of spatial awareness by the pilots, which lead to disorientation and the subsequent impact with water. According to the airline's rules the crew of Flight 312 should have abandoned the approach since the weather and visibility conditions were under the minimum allowed to continue, and the fact that they didn't was one of the main causes of the crash. Additionally the helicopter was not equipped with any float system, and neither lifejackets nor rafts were available for the occupants to evacuate.

The AIBN also issued safety reccomandations after the crash. Mainly regarding stricter safety measures for flights in dangerous areas and to dangerous airports, like those in the Svalbard archipelago, like better emergency equipment, that was lacking on Flight 312, and better instruments for flying. It was also asked to Convers Avia to do better checks and implement stricter safety procedures, to correct the numerous violations found.

== Aftermath ==
Norwegian Prime Minister, Erna Solberg, sent her condolences to the families of the victims, the russian community in the Svalbard and to the Prime Minister of Russia, Dmitry Medvedev.

In 2018 the families of the victims asked to the Norwegian Government to start a new search for the seven missing people which were not found during the recovery of the helicopter, since as one of them said "the fact that nobody was found after the helicopter crash made us hope that someone managed to survive". A judicial case was opened after the accident by the prosecutor of Troms og Finnmark. The case was later archived in 2020 after the release of the final report.
