= Barentsburg =

Russian settlement in Svalbard, Norway

Barentsburg Баренцбург
- Russian coal mining settlement
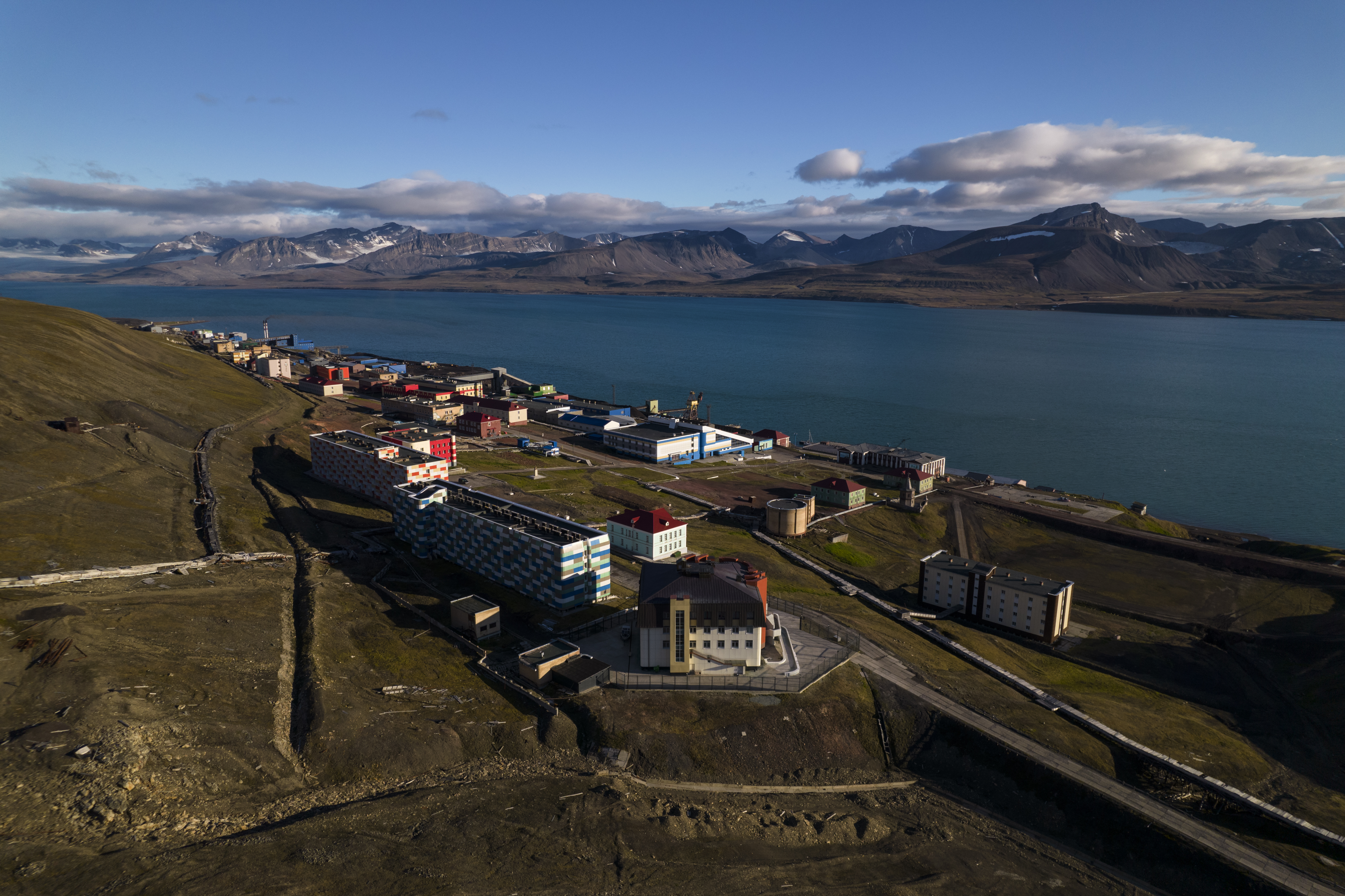
- The town from above

- Location in western Svalbard
- Coordinates: 78°04′0″N 14°13′0″E
- Country: Norway
- Syssel: Svalbard
- Island: Spitsbergen

Population (2025)
  - Total: 297 (Note: The population figure includes Pyramiden.)
- Time zone: UTC+1 (CET)
  - Summer (DST): UTC+2 (CEST)
- Postal code: 9178

Barentsburg (Russian: Баренцбург) is the second-largest settlement in Svalbard, Norway, with about 300 inhabitants (2025). A coal mining town, the settlement is now almost entirely made up of Russian nationals.

== History ==
Rijpsburg, a now abandoned Dutch settlement on Spitsbergen on Cape Boheman (Bohemanflya), at the north site of Nordfjorden in the Isfjord, stood roughly diagonally opposite Longyearbyen. The Rotterdam-based Van der Eb & Dresselhuys Scheepvaartmaatschappij (a navigation company) built it in 1920, using prefabricated huts, for the mining of coal. Twelve Dutch staff and 52 German miners started mining coal here that year.

The Dutch Spitsbergen Company, founded in 1920, bought a mine in Green Harbour from the Russians and mined coal from 1921 to 1926. The company renamed its settlement Barentsburg after the Dutch explorer Willem Barentsz. In 1932 the company sold the mine, including its settlement Barentsburg, to the Soviet trust Arktikugol.

=== 2006 fire ===
On 17 October 2006, Norwegian inspectors detected a smouldering underground fire in Barentsburg, prompting fears that an open fire might break out, which would have forced the total evacuation of Barentsburg for an indefinite period of time, and would also have caused environmental problems of unknown magnitude for the entire archipelago. The fire was later contained. Coal mining resumed at the end of 2010.

=== 2020s ===
Before the Russian full-scale invasion of Ukraine in February 2022, Barentsburg population also included many Ukrainians, some Norwegians and people of other nationalities. However since the beginning of the war, most non-Russian inhabitants left on their own or were asked to do so by local authorities. In particular, Ukrainian nationals were ordered to leave unless they accepted Russian passports which they were offered.

In 2022, Russia announced new investment plans to support its presence in Barentsburg and Pyramiden. Then, in 2023, amid continuing tensions around Russia's war against Ukraine, the Russian Consulate General and Arktikugol held a May 9 Day victory parade through Barentsburg consisting of 50 cars, snowmobiles, trucks and buses and also including a low-flying Mi-8 helicopter. While the Governor of Svalbard, Lars Fause, was reportedly invited to attend, he declined. According to a report in the Economist in 2025, relations between Russian and other towns were better during the Cold War, with residents ending visits on national days.

The Russian parades are more militaristic nowadays [...] and involve symbols of cultural difference such as a wooden Orthodox cross. A few Soviet flags have been painted on structures in Barentsburg. Russians can enter Svalbard, visa free, if they travel by boat from Murmansk. One pro-Putin bishop has paid repeated visits to be filmed beside Orthodox religious items.

Similar concerns were raised by Norwegians pursuant to events held by Russian authorities on Svalbard in 2026.

== Status ==
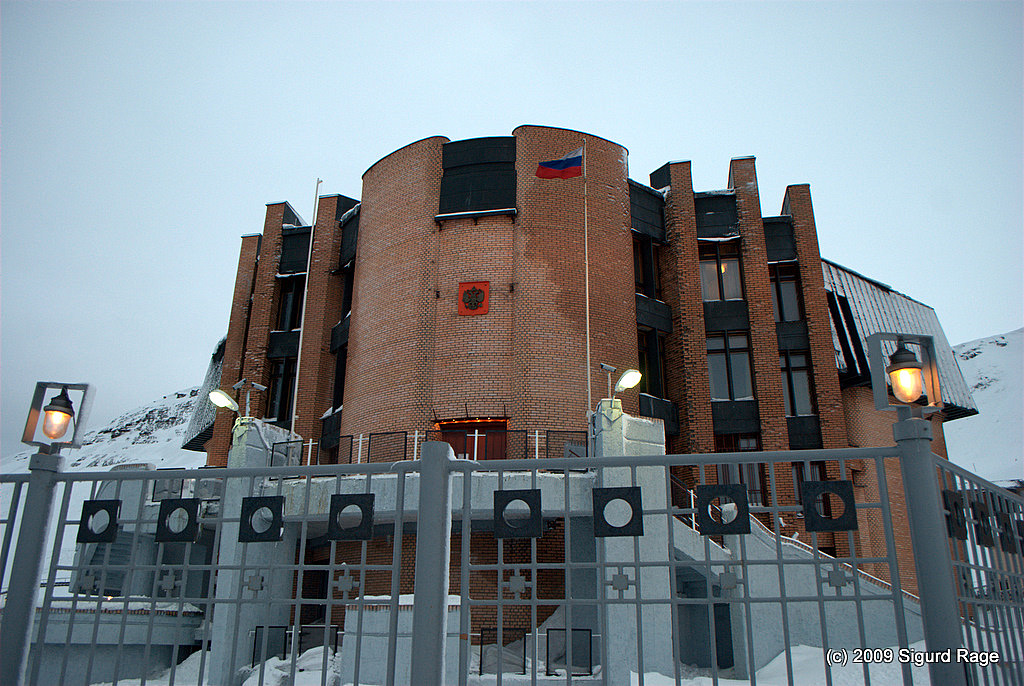
The Russian consulate in Barentsburg

Under the terms of the Svalbard Treaty of 1920, citizens of signatory countries have equal rights to exploit natural resources, and as a result Russia, along with Norway (via the Sveagruva mine and Mine 7), maintains mining operations on Svalbard. However, as Svalbard is under Norwegian sovereignty, the Russian government is represented in Barentsburg by a consulate.

Consequently, the town has a Norwegian postcode, 9178. Similarly, it uses Norwegian telephone numbering.

== Economy ==
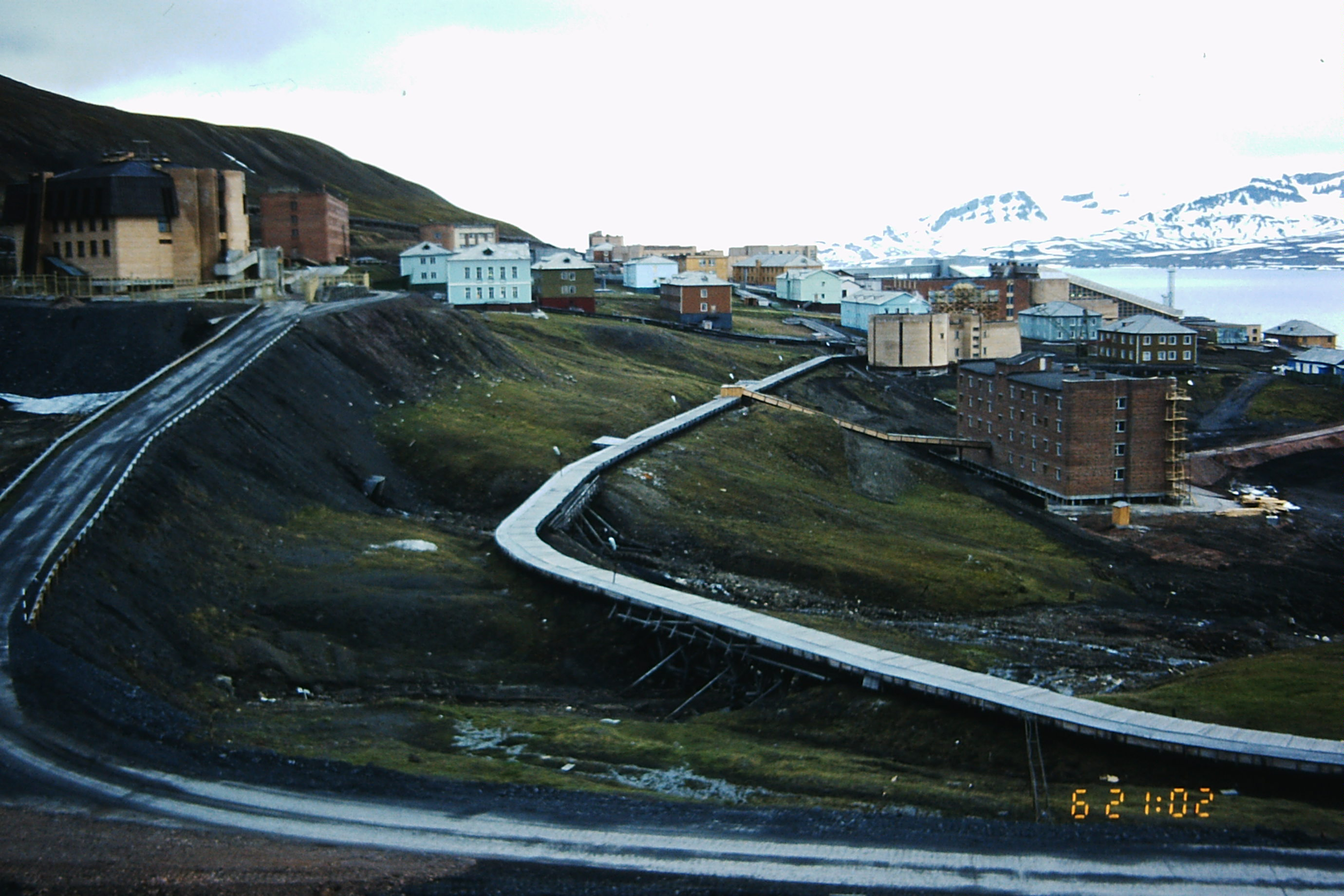
Barentsburg mining town in summer 1989

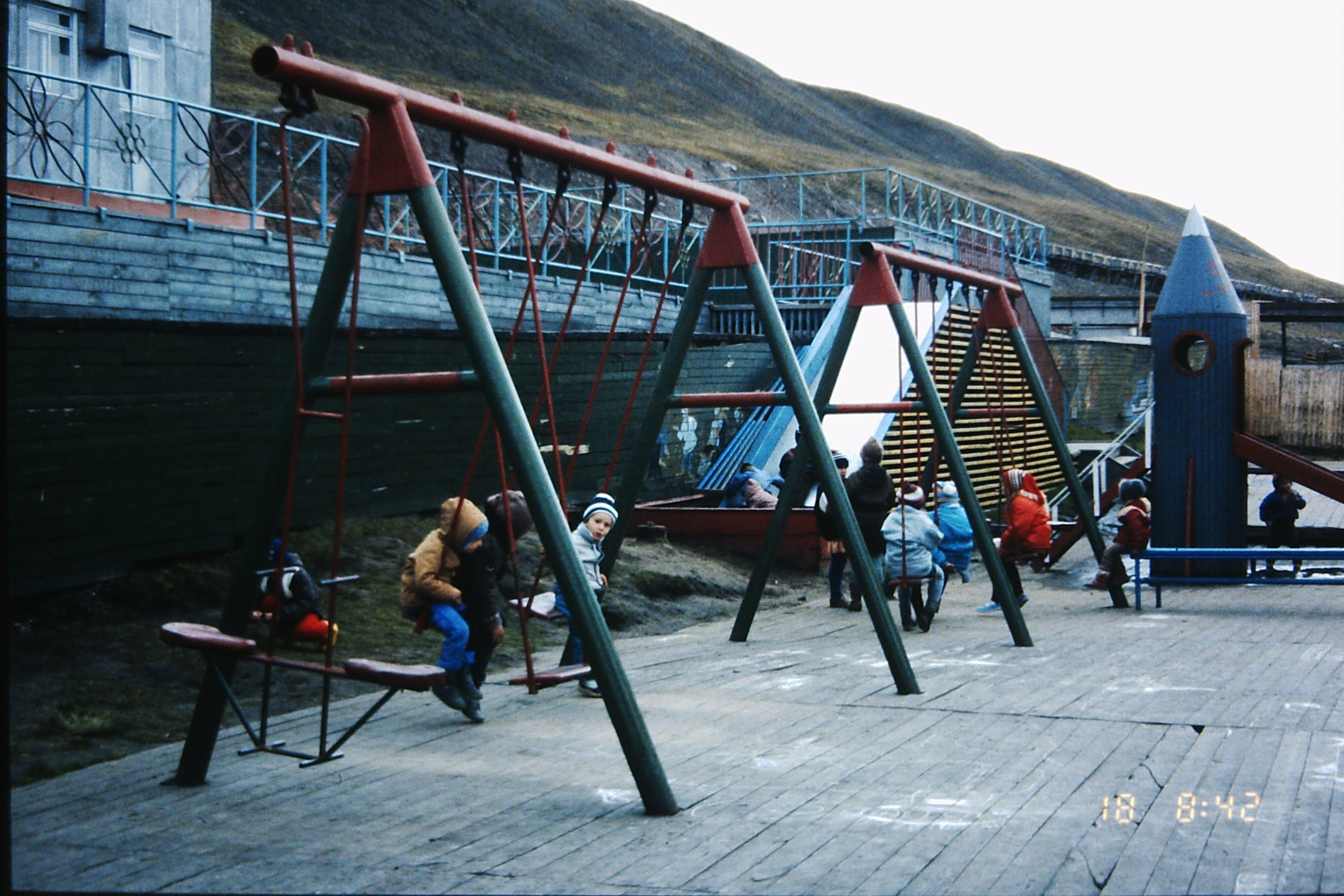
Barentsburg Kindergarten, August 1989

Barentsburg started as a Dutch mining town in the 1920s. In 1932 the Dutch sold their concession to the Soviet Union. Since 1932 the Russian state-owned Arktikugol (Russian for 'arctic coal') trust has been operating on Svalbard and the main economic activity in Barentsburg is coal mining by Arktikugol. The coal is usually exported to Northern European buyers. The town relies entirely on mainland Russia for food and coinage. There have been instances in which not enough food was sent, and aid packages were sent from Longyearbyen. Tourism is now being developed, but does not yet generate enough income to revive the town.

Prior to 2022, the majority of workers and inhabitants were Russians and Ukrainians. After the breakup of the Soviet Union, the economy of Barentsburg has been in steady decline, and population, which once numbered around a thousand, has decreased drastically.

Amid the warming waters, Russia said in 2021 it intends to build a facility in Barentsburg to process fish for export.

== Transportation ==
The distance from Longyearbyen to Barentsburg is about 55 kilometres (30 mi), but there are no roads connecting the two settlements. Most contact between the two is by boat, snowmobile, and helicopter. There is a heliport (ICAO code ENBA) with a road connection at Heerodden (78.100809°N 14.196224°E), 4 kilometres (2 mi) north of Barentsburg. The port is located in the middle of Barentsburg. Tourists usually arrive via a 2–3-hour boat trip from Longyearbyen. The coal is freighted by ship.

== Climate ==
Barentsburg features a tundra climate (ETs under the Köppen climate classification), with short, dry, chilly summers and long, very cold, snowy winters, though winters there are noticeably warmer than winters in a number of locations with tundra climates. Because the town is located at a latitude approaching 80 degrees, only four months of the year have average temperatures above freezing, and in no month does the average monthly temperature exceed 10 °C (50 °F), meaning it is north of the tree line. Average low temperatures during the winter routinely drop below −15 °C (5 °F). Barentsburg averages roughly 550 millimetres (22 in) of precipitation, much of which falls as snow. The town typically experiences snowfall in every month of the year.

Climate data for Barentsburg (1991–2020, extremes 1932–present)
Month	Jan	Feb	Mar	Apr	May	Jun	Jul	Aug	Sep	Oct	Nov	Dec	Year
Record high °C (°F)	6.8 (44.2)	5.6 (42.1)	4.1 (39.4)	5.3 (41.5)	9.9 (49.8)	14.6 (58.3)	20.3 (68.5)	17.9 (64.2)	12.1 (53.8)	8.5 (47.3)	6.8 (44.2)	7.6 (45.7)	20.3 (68.5)
Mean daily maximum °C (°F)	−7.7 (18.1)	−8.2 (17.2)	−8.6 (16.5)	−5.9 (21.4)	−0.7 (30.7)	4.6 (40.3)	8.7 (47.7)	7.5 (45.5)	3.5 (38.3)	−1.8 (28.8)	−4 (25)	−6.1 (21.0)	−1.6 (29.1)
Daily mean °C (°F)	−10.3 (13.5)	−11 (12)	−11.3 (11.7)	−8.4 (16.9)	−2.7 (27.1)	2.8 (37.0)	6.4 (43.5)	5.5 (41.9)	1.8 (35.2)	−3.7 (25.3)	−6.3 (20.7)	−8.6 (16.5)	−3.8 (25.2)
Mean daily minimum °C (°F)	−13 (9)	−13.7 (7.3)	−13.9 (7.0)	−10.9 (12.4)	−4.4 (24.1)	1.4 (34.5)	4.8 (40.6)	4.0 (39.2)	0.3 (32.5)	−5.6 (21.9)	−8.7 (16.3)	−11.1 (12.0)	−5.9 (21.4)
Record low °C (°F)	−37.1 (−34.8)	−39.3 (−38.7)	−39.8 (−39.6)	−33.3 (−27.9)	−22.5 (−8.5)	−9.2 (15.4)	−1.0 (30.2)	−3.5 (25.7)	−12.2 (10.0)	−27.1 (−16.8)	−29.3 (−20.7)	−37.3 (−35.1)	−39.8 (−39.6)
Average precipitation mm (inches)	61 (2.4)	47 (1.9)	58 (2.3)	36 (1.4)	31 (1.2)	20 (0.8)	29 (1.1)	40 (1.6)	55 (2.2)	59 (2.3)	67 (2.6)	62 (2.4)	565 (22.2)
Average rainy days	2	1	2	1	3	10	17	16	12	4	3	2	73
Average snowy days	24	20	22	20	20	10	1	3	14	22	23	24	203
Average relative humidity (%)	77	77	77	77	79	81	81	82	81	77	77	77	79
Source: Pogoda.ru.net

== Science and culture ==
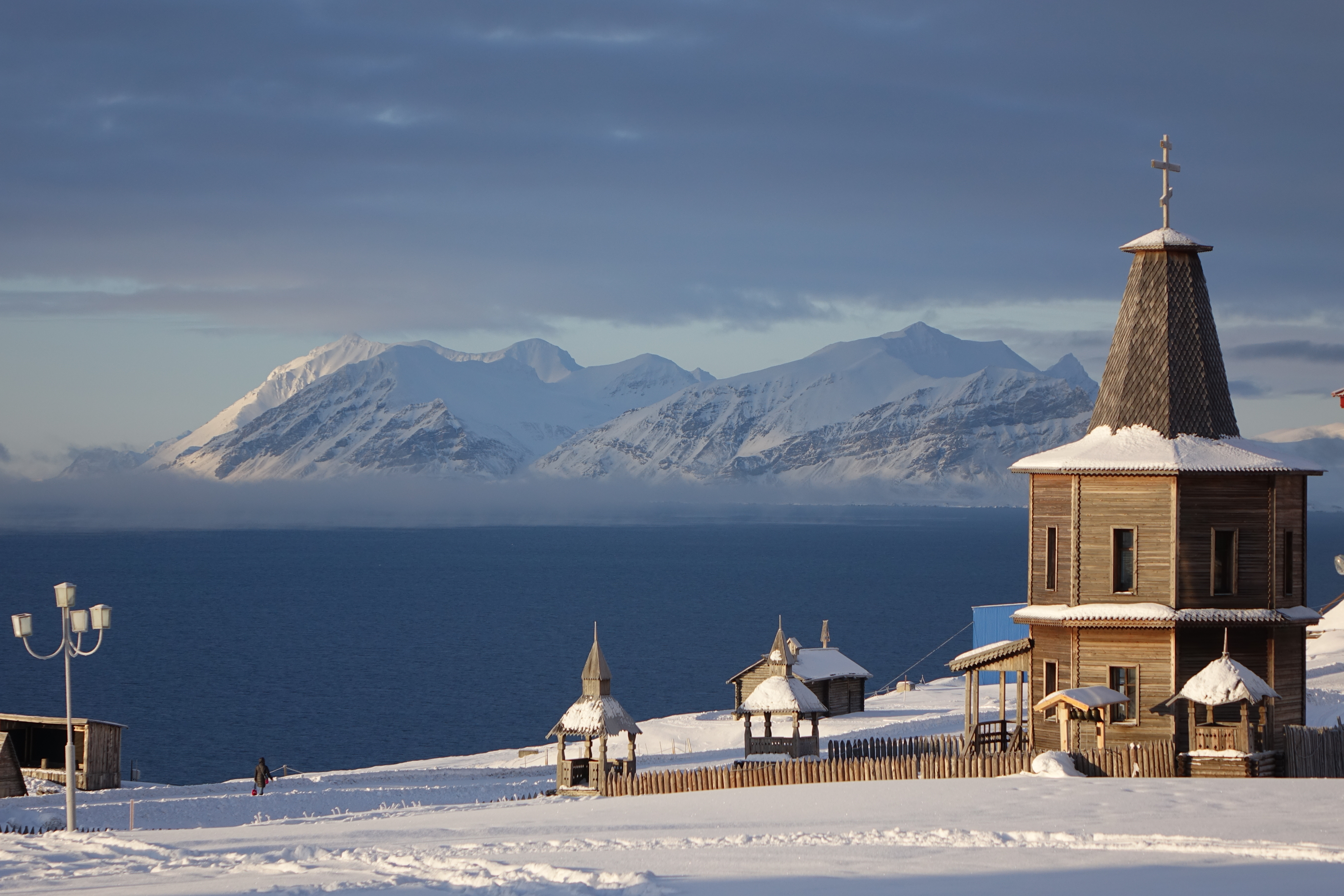
The old Barentsburg church

The Barentsburg Pomor Museum presents Pomor culture, Arctic flora and fauna, and archaeological objects preserved in the permafrost. It is open when the daily, summer-only boat from Longyearbyen arrives, and by special arrangement. There is an athletic complex, including a swimming pool with heated seawater.

Every summer, several dozen geophysicists, geologists, archaeologists, biologists, glaciologists, geographers, and others from Russia and elsewhere work in the scientific research centre. There is also a year-round meteorological observatory and the northernmost cosmic rays station.

== Education ==
Barentsburg has its own school serving the Russian community. in 2014 it had three teachers, with one for most subjects, one for music, and one for the English language. By 2014, its welfare funds had declined.

=== Gallery ===
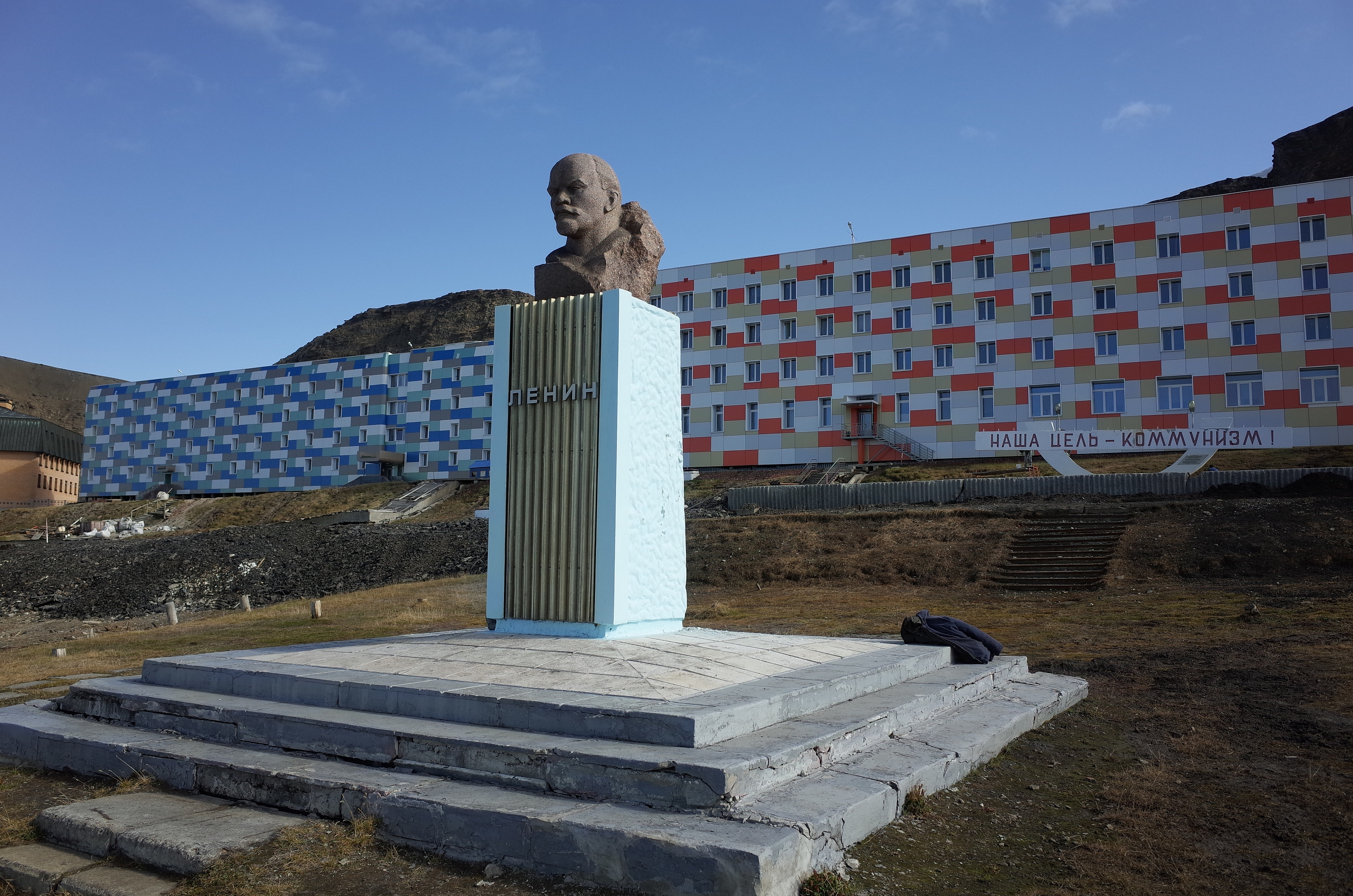
Bust of Lenin (Inscription in the background — Communism is our goal)

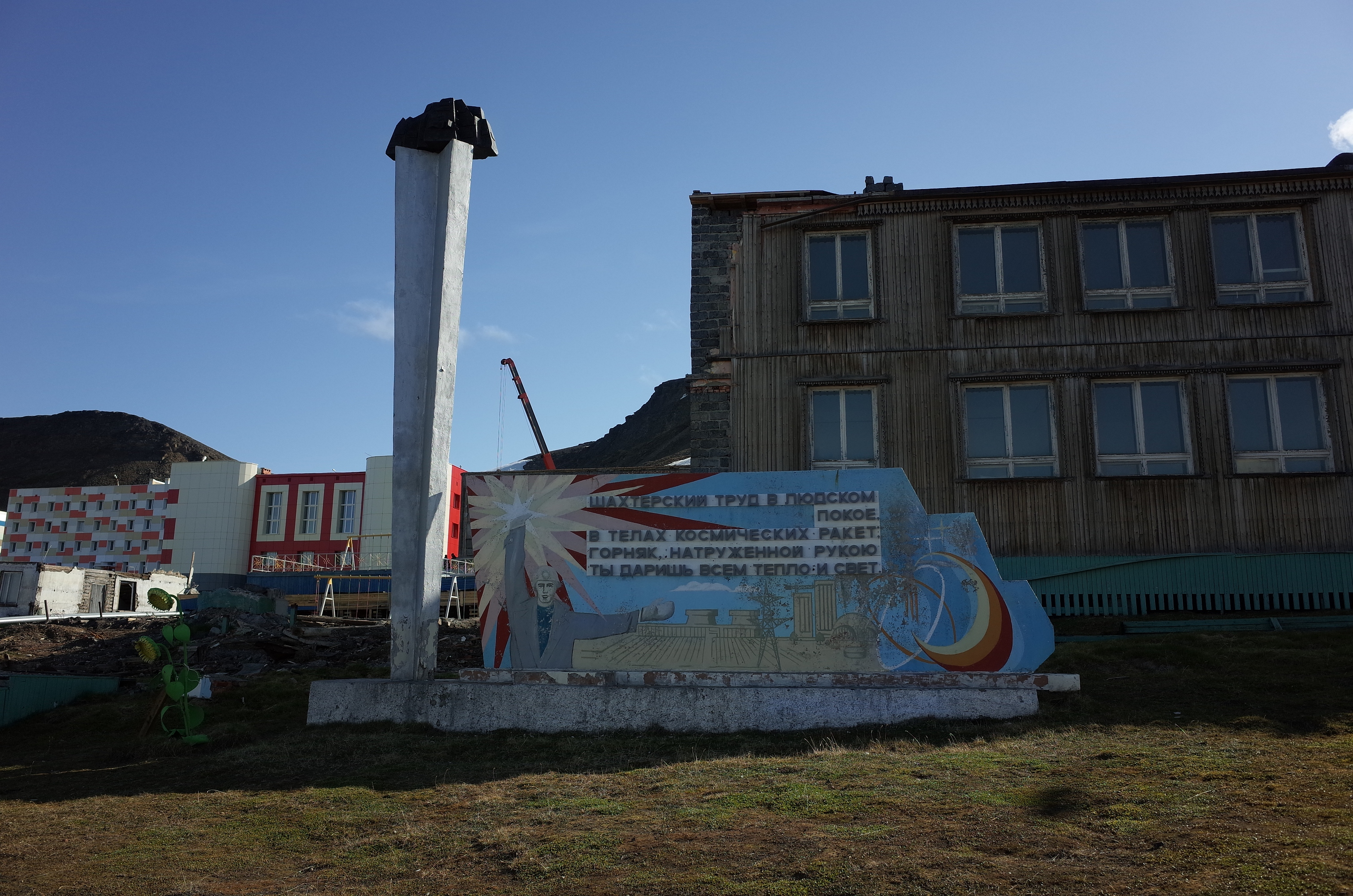
Soviet stone stele (Through miner's labor, peace is sown, In cosmic rockets, hushed and deep. With hands by toil and hardship known, You give the world its light and heat.)

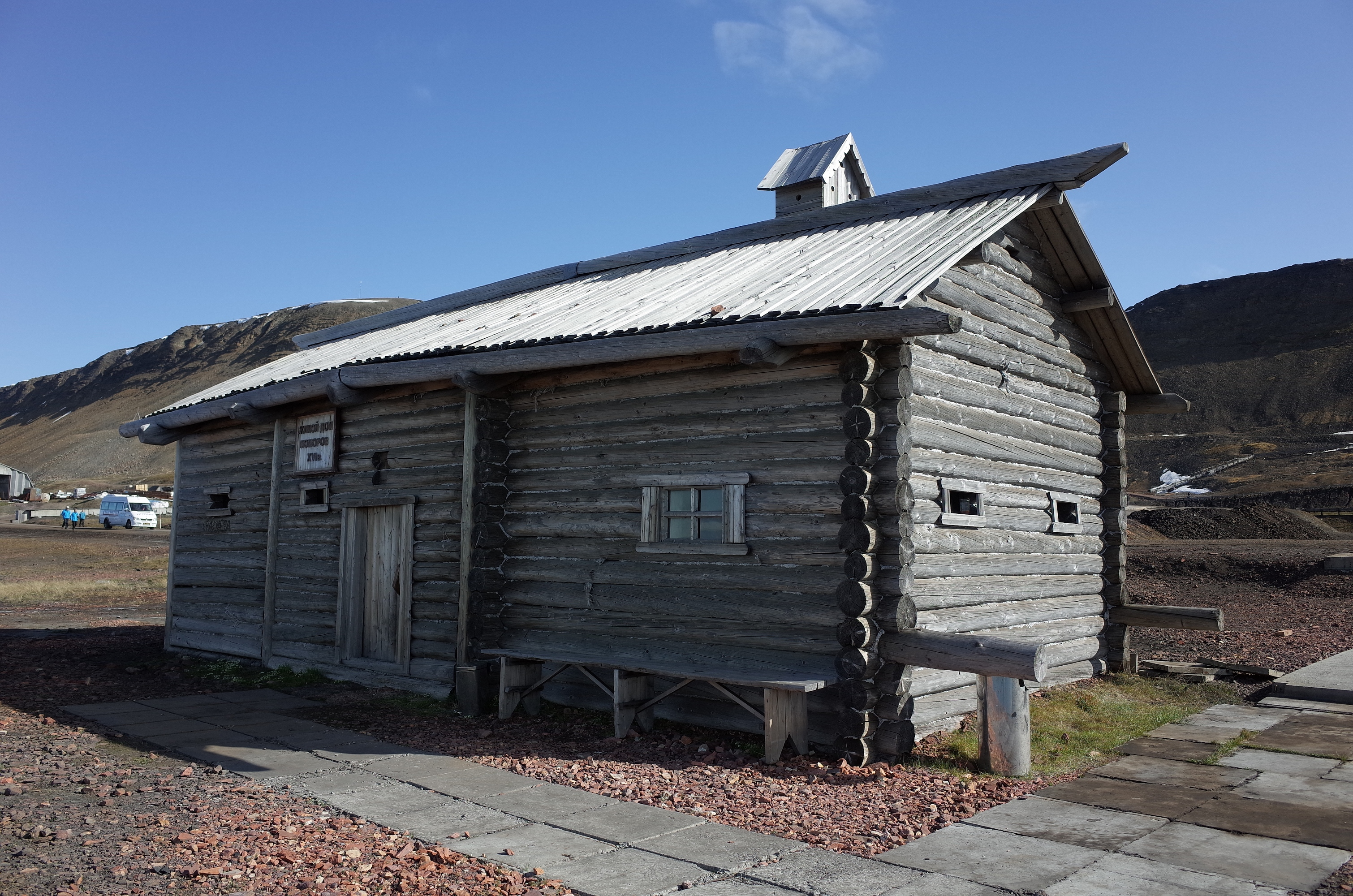
Pomors 16th century hut

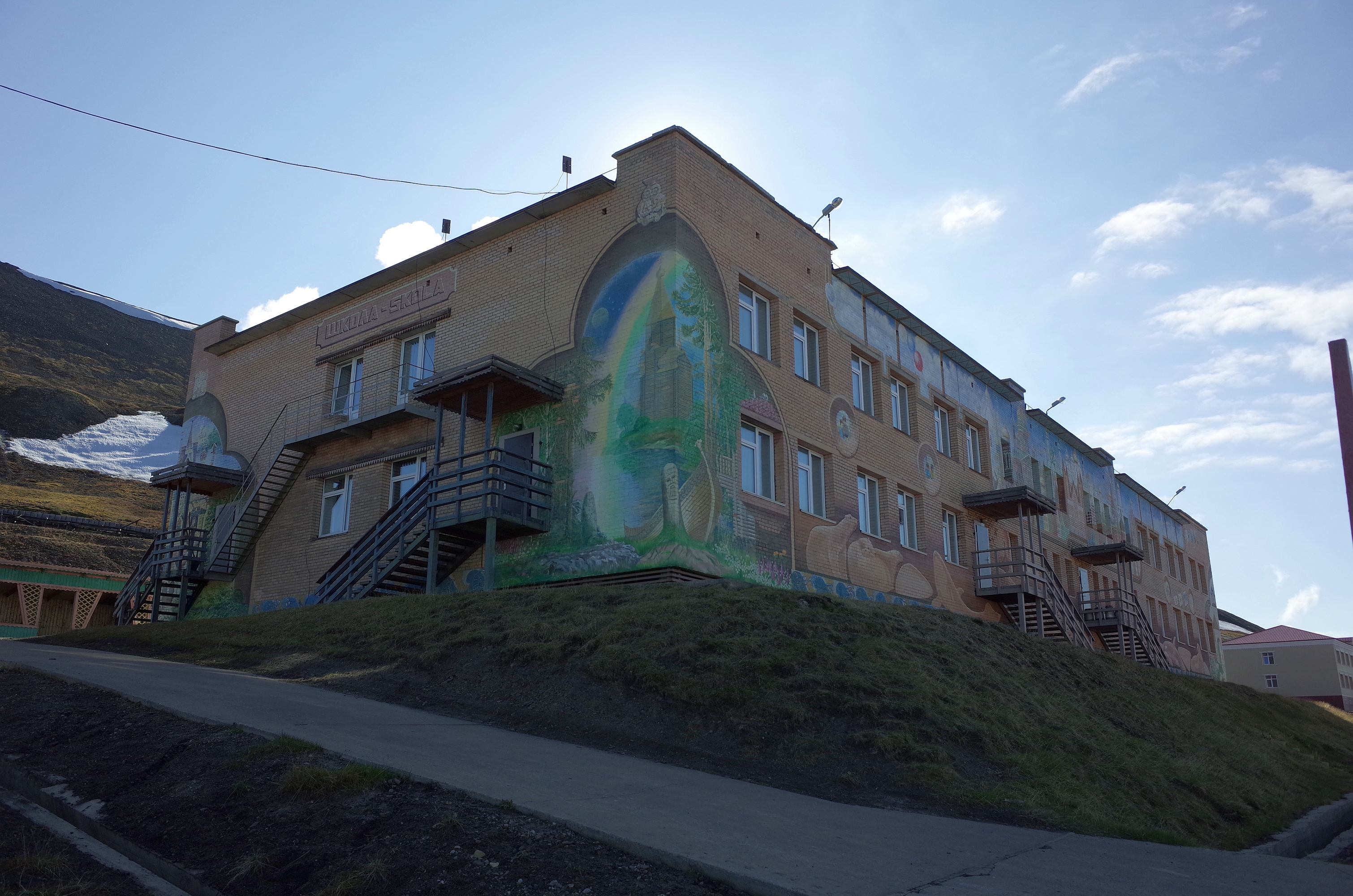
School

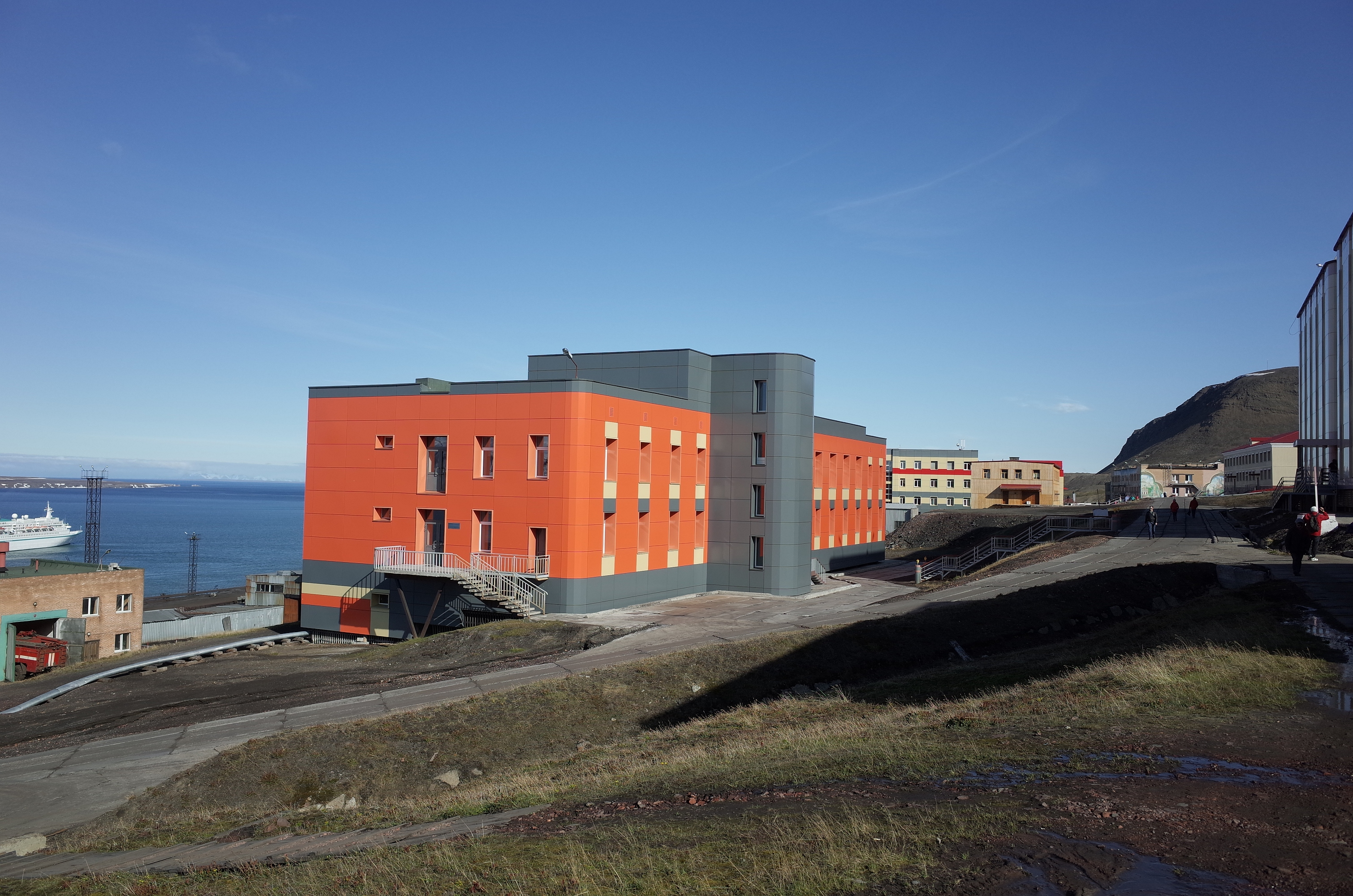
Hospital

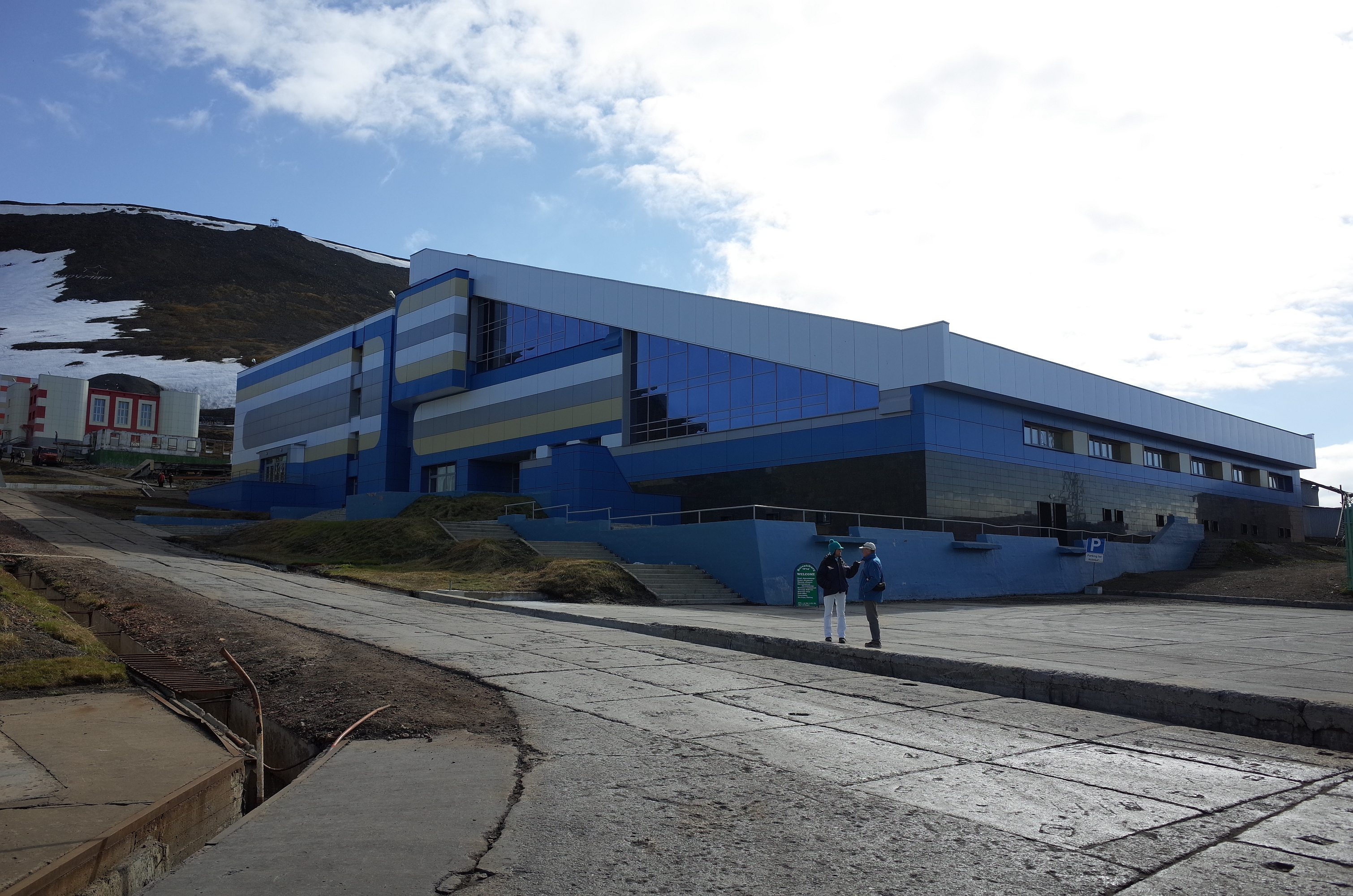
Sports Center

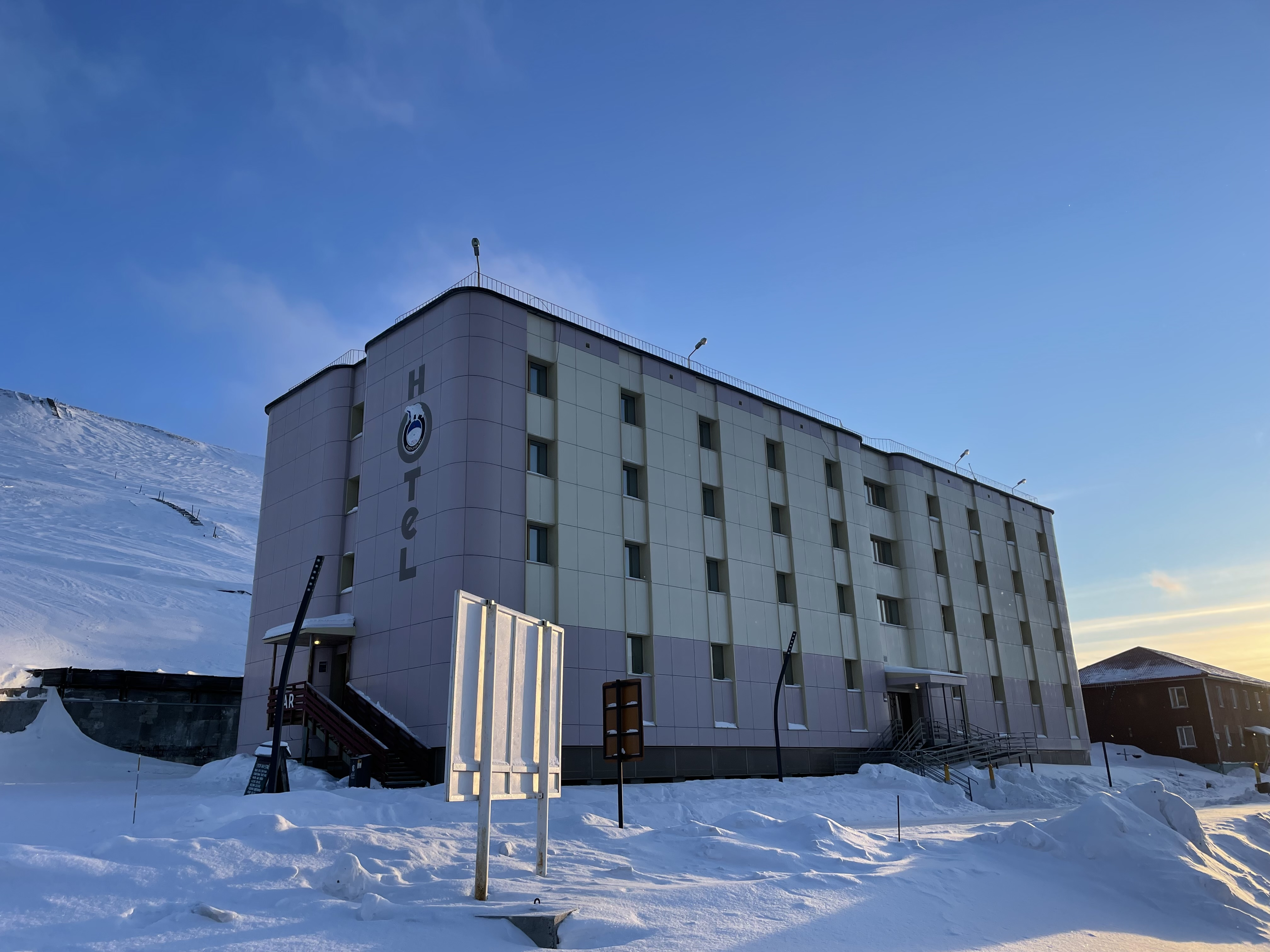
Hotel

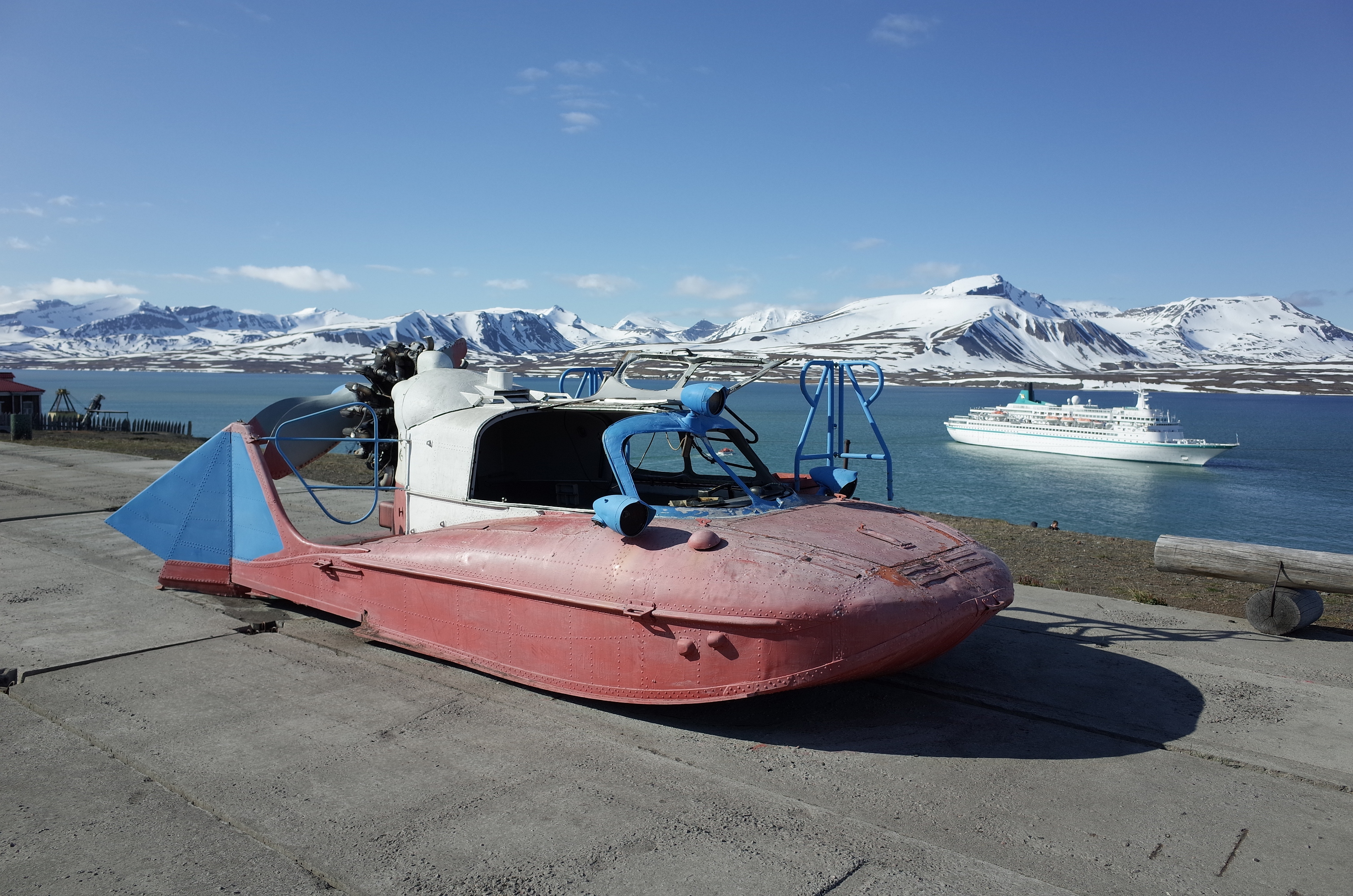
Remains of Tupolev A-3 Aerosledge

== See also ==
- Pyramiden
