= Convers Avia =

Russian airline

Convers Avia Авиакомпания Конверс Авиа
- Founded: 1995
- Hubs: Tver
- Fleet size: 30
- Headquarters: Tver, Russia
- Website: conversavia.ru

Convers Avia is an airline based in Tver, Russia. It operates charter flights, mainly within Russia but also as far afield as ice breakers in Afghanistan and Norway. Its main base is Zmeevo Airport where the company founded itself. It is currently banned from flying in the EU.

== History ==
The airline was formed in 1995.

== Destinations ==
The airline flies charters throughout Russia on behalf of numerous major companies, its main activity is acting as a shuttle to take staff to work in remote areas and to ice breakers

== Fleet ==
As of November 2012, the Convers Avia fleet includes Mil Mi-8, Mil Mi-2 and Robinson R-44 helicopters

== Accidents ==
- Convers Avia Flight 312, a Mil Mi-8 helicopter crashed in the Svalbard archipelago.
