= Pyramiden Heliport =

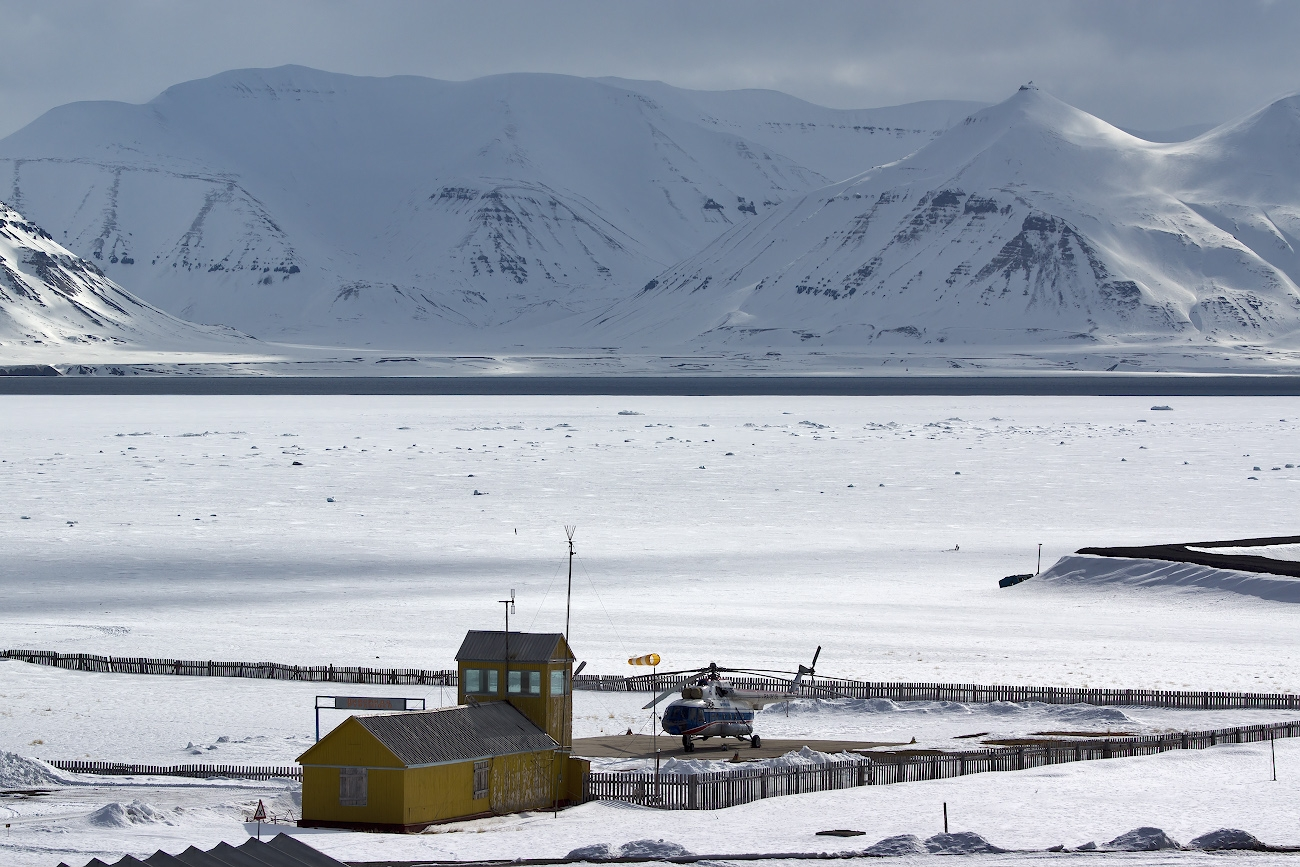
- IATA: none; ICAO: ENPY

Summary
- Airport type: Private
- Operator: Arktikugol
- Serves: Pyramiden, Svalbard, Norway
- Elevation AMSL: 2 m / 6 ft
- Coordinates: 78°39′08″N 16°20′13″E

Map
- Location within Svalbard

Helipads
Number	Length		Surface
Number	m	ft	Surface
	90	295	Gravel

Pyramiden Heliport (Norwegian: Pyramiden helikopterhavn; ICAO: ENPY) is a heliport located at Pyramiden in Svalbard, Norway. The airport is owned and operated by Arktikugol, who owns the mining town. The airport consists of a gravel runway and apron measuring 90 by 40 meters (300 by 130 ft) and a small terminal building. There is capacity for up to three helicopters on the apron. Flights are carried out by Spark+ using two Mil Mi-8 helicopters. Flights are flown to Barentsburg Heliport, Heerodden and Svalbard Airport, Longyear at irregular intervals.

The airport opened in 1961 to allow Aeroflot to commence flights between Barentsburg and Pyramiden using Mil Mi-4 aircraft. An upgrade was carried out in the late 1970s after the airport in Longyearbyen opened. By then five Mil Mi-8 were stationed on Svalbard. A crash during landing on 27 March 1991 killed two people. Flights were reduced during the 1990s and from 1998 Pyramiden was abandoned, reducing use of the heliport to a minimum.

== History ==
Arktikugol commenced flights on Svalbard in 1961, at first operating a shuttle service between their two remaining mining towns, Barentsburg and Pyramiden. Barentsburg received a larger facility and was the base of operations. Flights were initially carried out by Aeroflot using two Mil Mi-4 helicopters with a capacity for eleven passengers. The Aviation Act applies to Svalbard and from 1961 to 1974 Arktikugol followed this by applying for and receiving a helicopter operating concession from the Ministry of Transport and Communications. After 1974 the Soviet Union stated that the regulations were in violation of the Svalbard Treaty allowing free shipping.

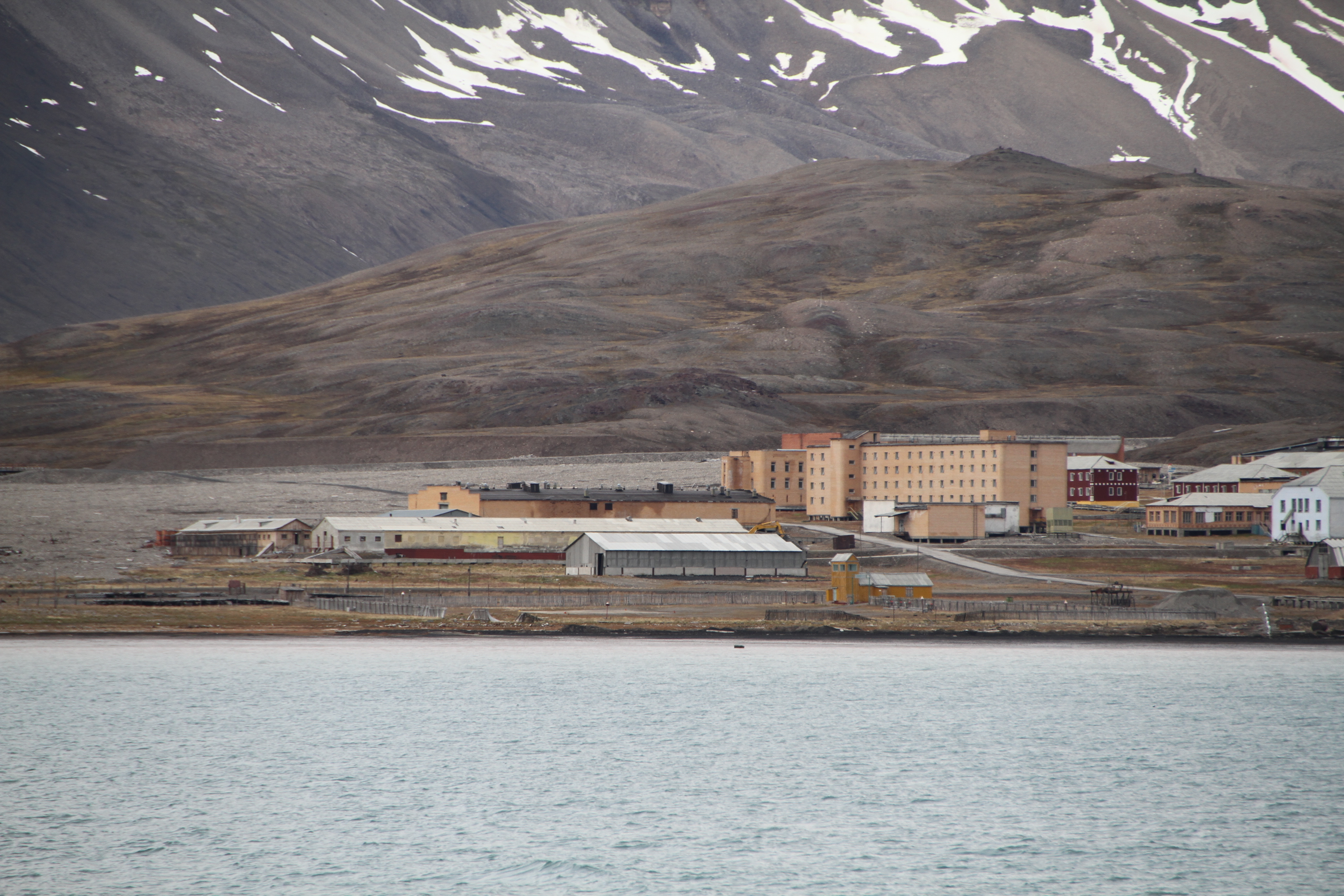
Location of the airport in relation to the town

The Soviet Union agreed in 1971 to allow the construction of Svalbard Airport, Longyear. The condition was that the airport be built with capacity to allow Aeroflot to operate flights to Moscow. This would again increase the need for the heliport in Pyramiden, as it would be used to fly passengers from Barentsburg to Longyearbyen. Svalbard Airport, Longyear opened in 1975. In 1977 the Civil Aviation Administration installed seven navigational lights around Billefjorden, aiding navigation through the polar night. This was met with some controversy, as one of the lights was placed in Gåsøyane Bird Sanctuary. Arktikugol increased its fleet to five Mil Mi-8 helicopters, all with Aeroflot markings. Each helicopter has a capacity of 28 passengers and a range of 375 kilometers (233 mi).

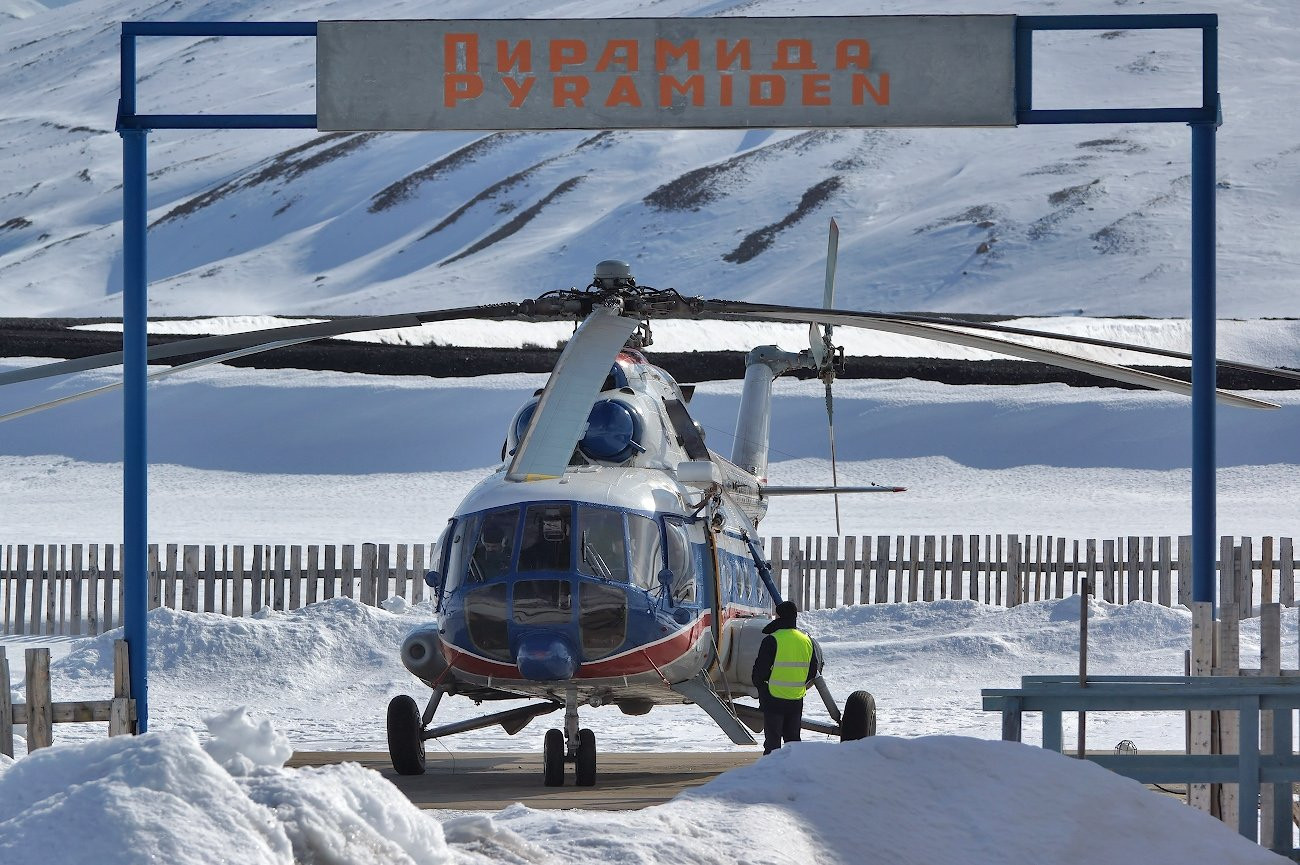
Mil Mi-8 operated by Spark+ for Arktikugol

Following the dissolution of the Soviet Union in 1991, subsidies and resources allocated to Svalbard and Arktikugol were diminished. By 1993 there were only two remaining helicopters, and all crew and airport employees were relocated to live in Barentsburg. During the early 1990s, there were about 40 to 60 aircraft movements per month at Pyramiden, with higher frequency during the summer. Operation were reduced from 1998 when Arktikugol closed Pyramiden. However, Arktikugol retains an operational heliport and continues irregular flights to Pyramiden.

== Facilities ==
The heliport is located on the southwestern part of Pyramiden. Situated at an elevation of 2 meters (6 ft 7 in) above mean sea level, it is about 200 meters (660 ft) from Billefjorden. The airport features a gravel runway and apron measuring 90 by 40 meters (300 by 130 ft). This allows for two helicopters to land during winter and three during summer. There is a small terminal building which also acts as a control tower. It is staffed during flight operations by a representative for the airline and provides aerodrome flight information service. The terminal building has capacity for both crew and passengers. The heliport is lit to allow for night flights.

== Airlines and destinations ==
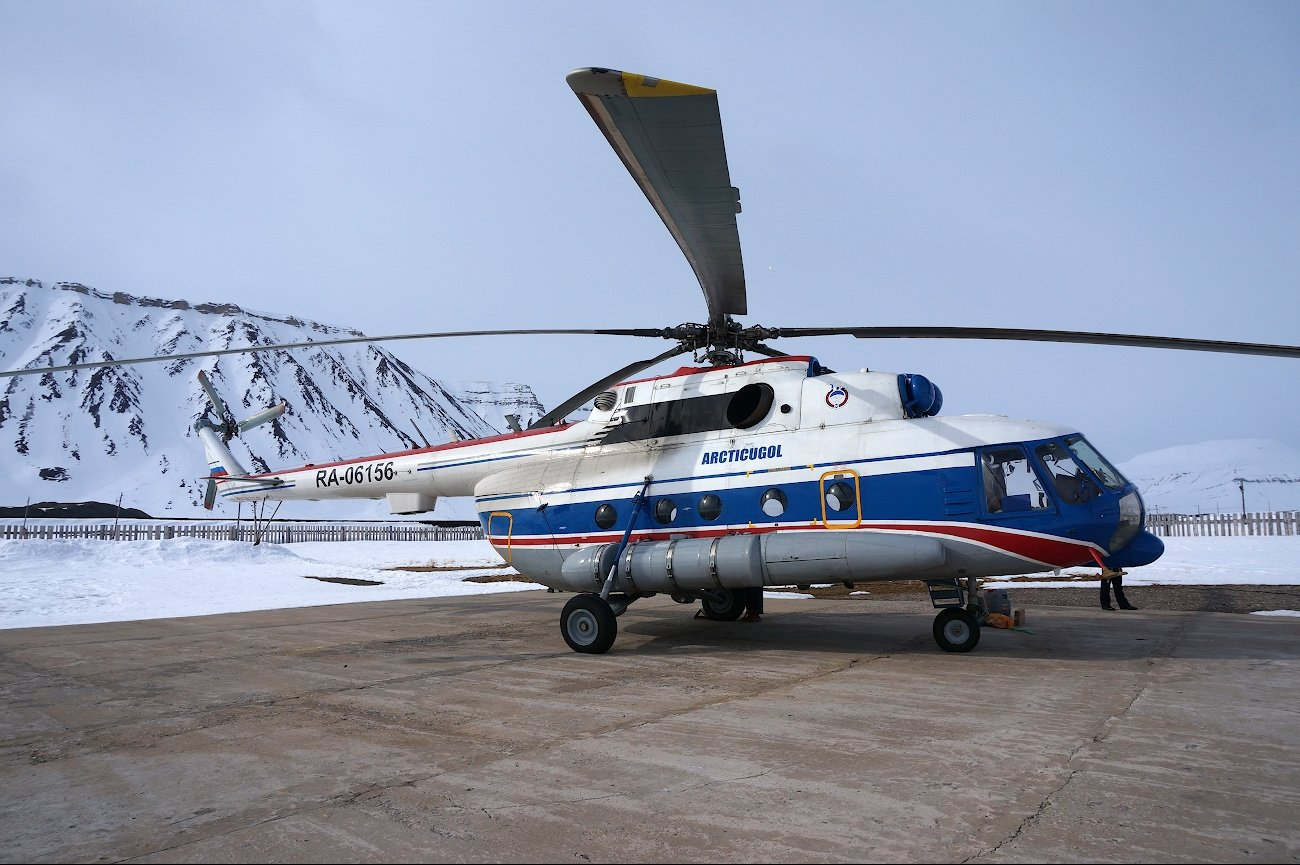
Mil Mi-8 operated by Spark+ for Arktikugol

Arktikugol has two Mil Mi-8 aircraft which are operated by Spark+. They are based at Barentsburg and provide transport services for Arktikugol and the Consulate-General of Russia in Barentsburg for flights to Barentsburg and to Longyearbyen.

== Accidents and incidents ==
On 27 March 1991 an Aeroflot Mi-8 helicopter crashed Mimerbukta, 800 meters (2,600 ft) from the airport. The helicopter was en route from Longyearbyen to Pyramiden with a crew of three and no passengers with the intent of flying employees to catch an Aeroflot flight to Moscow. The pilot lost visual references during the landing, which was carried out during difficult weather conditions. Two of the three people on board were killed.

== Bibliography ==
- Accident Investigation Board Norway (1991). "Rapport om luftfartsulykke den 27. mars 1991 på isen i Mimerbukta 800 m sydøst for landingsplassen ved Pyramiden Svalbard, med helikopter Aeroflot 06155" (in Norwegian).
- Accident Investigation Board Norway (2013). "Report concerning aviation accident on the Cape Heer Heliport, Svalbard, Norway, 30 March 2008 with Mil Mi-8MT, RA-06152, operated by Spark+ Airline Ltd".
- Holm, Kari (1999). Longyearbyen – Svalbard: historisk veiviser (in Norwegian). K. Holm. ISBN 82-992142-4-6.
- Risanger, Otto (1978). Russerne på Svalbard (in Norwegian). Longyearbyen: Sampress. ISBN 82-90210-03-5.
