= Grønfjorden =

Fjord in Svalbard, Norway

Coordinates: 78°03′N 14°11′E

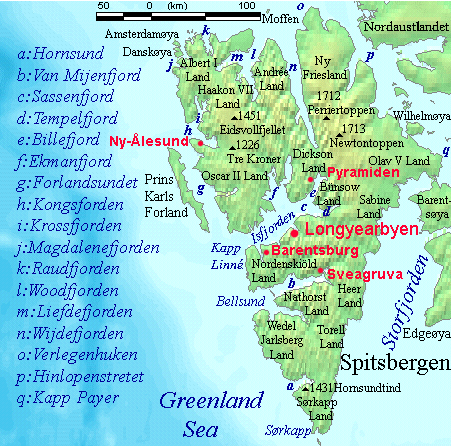
Grønfjorden lies on the southern side of Isfjorden on Spitsbergen's west coast

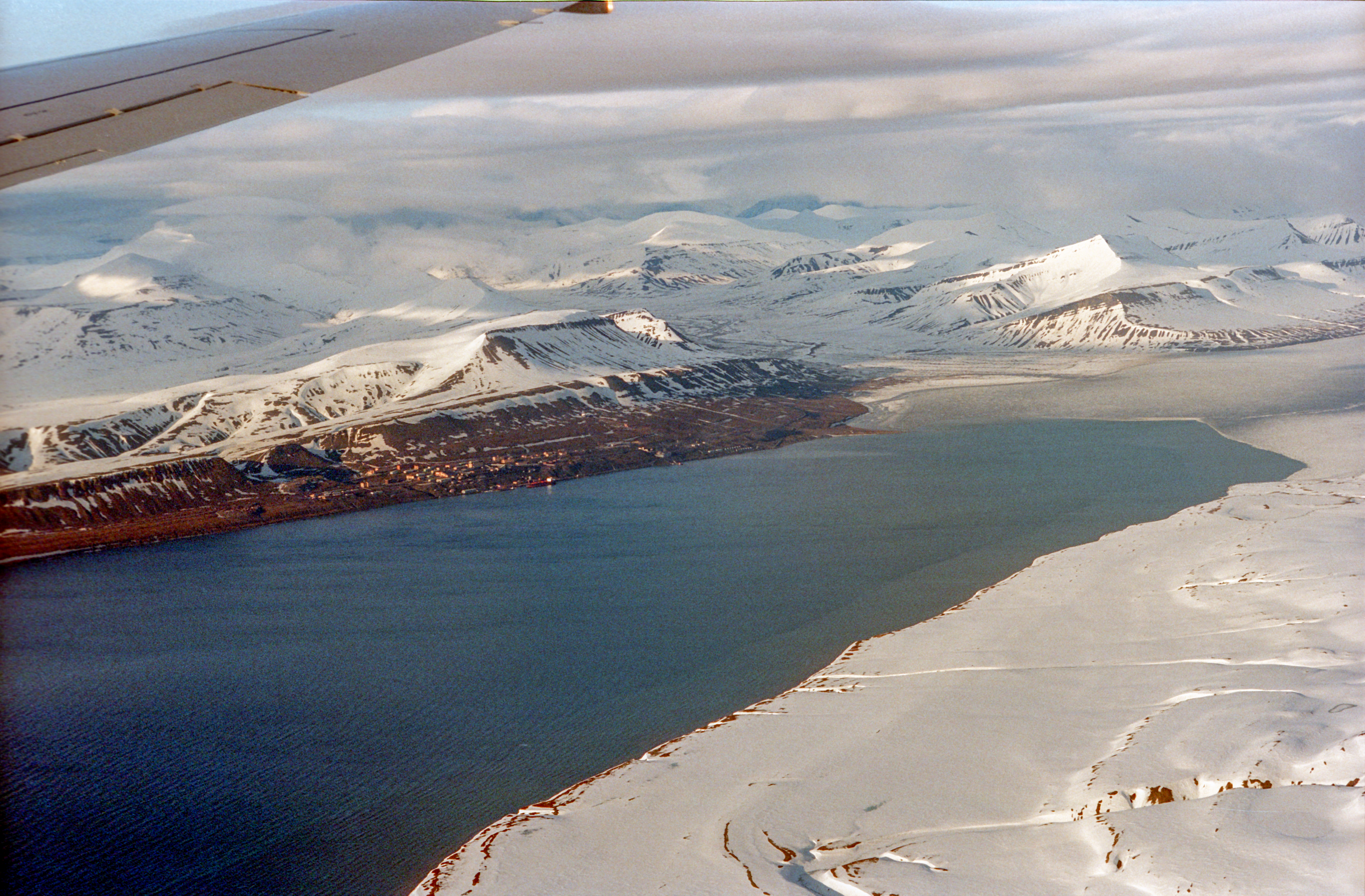
Grønfjorden

Grønfjorden (English: Green Fjord or Green Harbour) is a 16 km long fjord in Svalbard, Norway separated from Isfjorden to the north by Festningsodden in the west and Heerodden in the east. It lies within the western portion of Nordenskiöld Land. On its eastern shore is the mining community of Barentsburg, the second largest settlement (after Longyearbyen) on Spitsbergen.

== History ==
The fjord was named Green Harbour by the English explorer (and later whaler) Jonas Poole in 1610. Grønfjorden is the Norwegian equivalent. The first whaleship (a Basque vessel) reached Grønfjorden in 1612; it continued to be used for whaling up until the 1650s.

Grønfjorden was the site of the air attack in 1942 during the Operation Fritham.

== See also ==
- History of Basque whaling
