= Heerodden =

Headland in Spitsbergen, Svalbard

Coordinates: 78.1038°N 14.1971°E

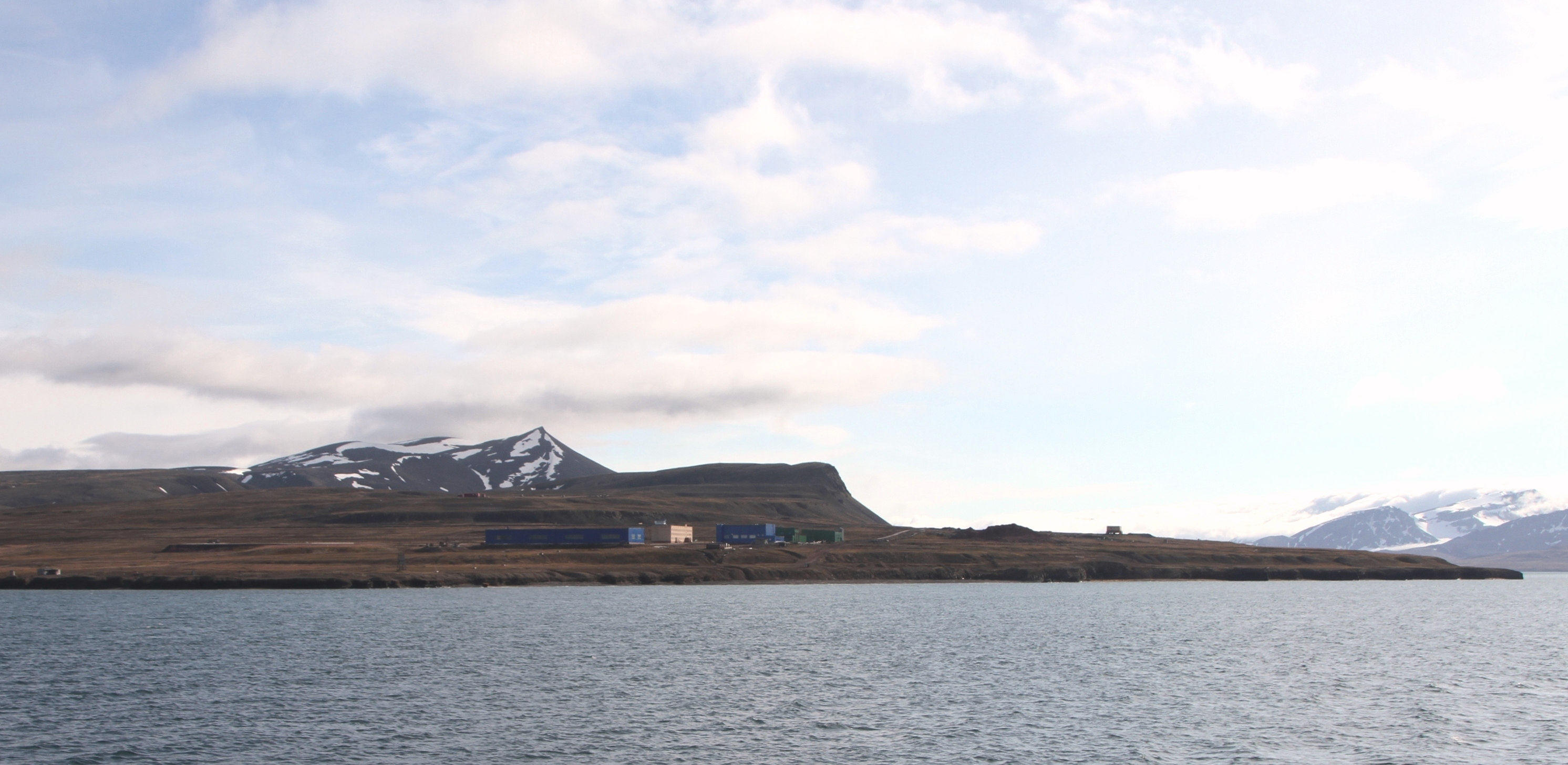
The headland and the airport as seen from Isfjorden

Heerodden is a cape at the southern side of Isfjorden, on the eastern side of the outlet of Grønfjorden, in Nordenskiöld Land on Spitsbergen, Svalbard. It is named after Swiss paleobotanist Oswald Heer. It is the site of Barentsburg Heliport, Heerodden.
