= Pyramiden =

Pyramiden Пирамида
- Ghost town
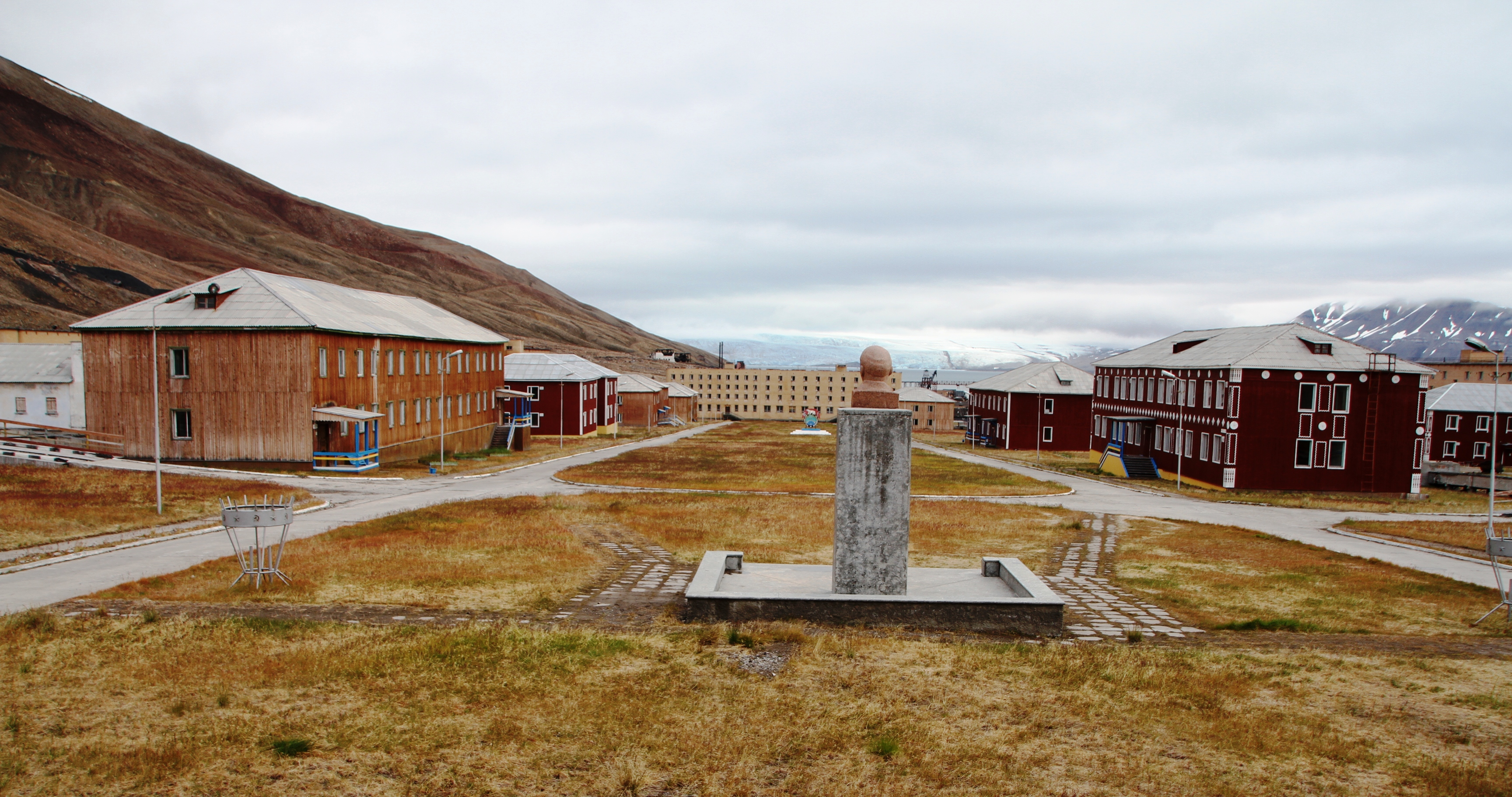
- Pyramiden in 2012

- Location within Svalbard
- Coordinates: 78°39′22″N 16°19′30″E
- Country: Norway
- Territory: Svalbard
- Island: Spitsbergen

Population (2016)
  - Total: 6 (During summer)
- Postal code: 9179

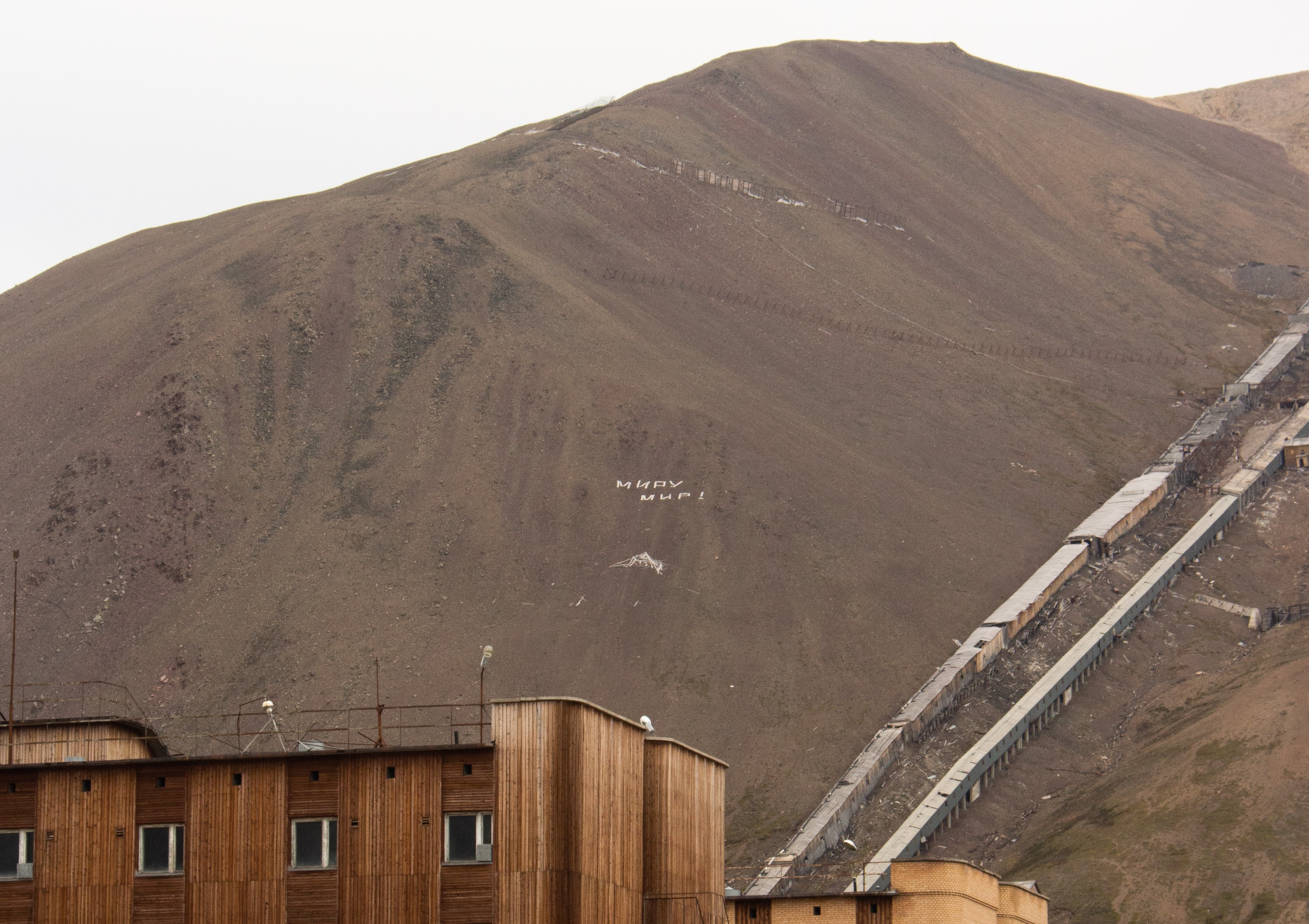
White writing above the abandoned coal mine. It says "Peace to the world!" in Russian (Миру мир!). The phrase was commonly used in Soviet state-owned projects.

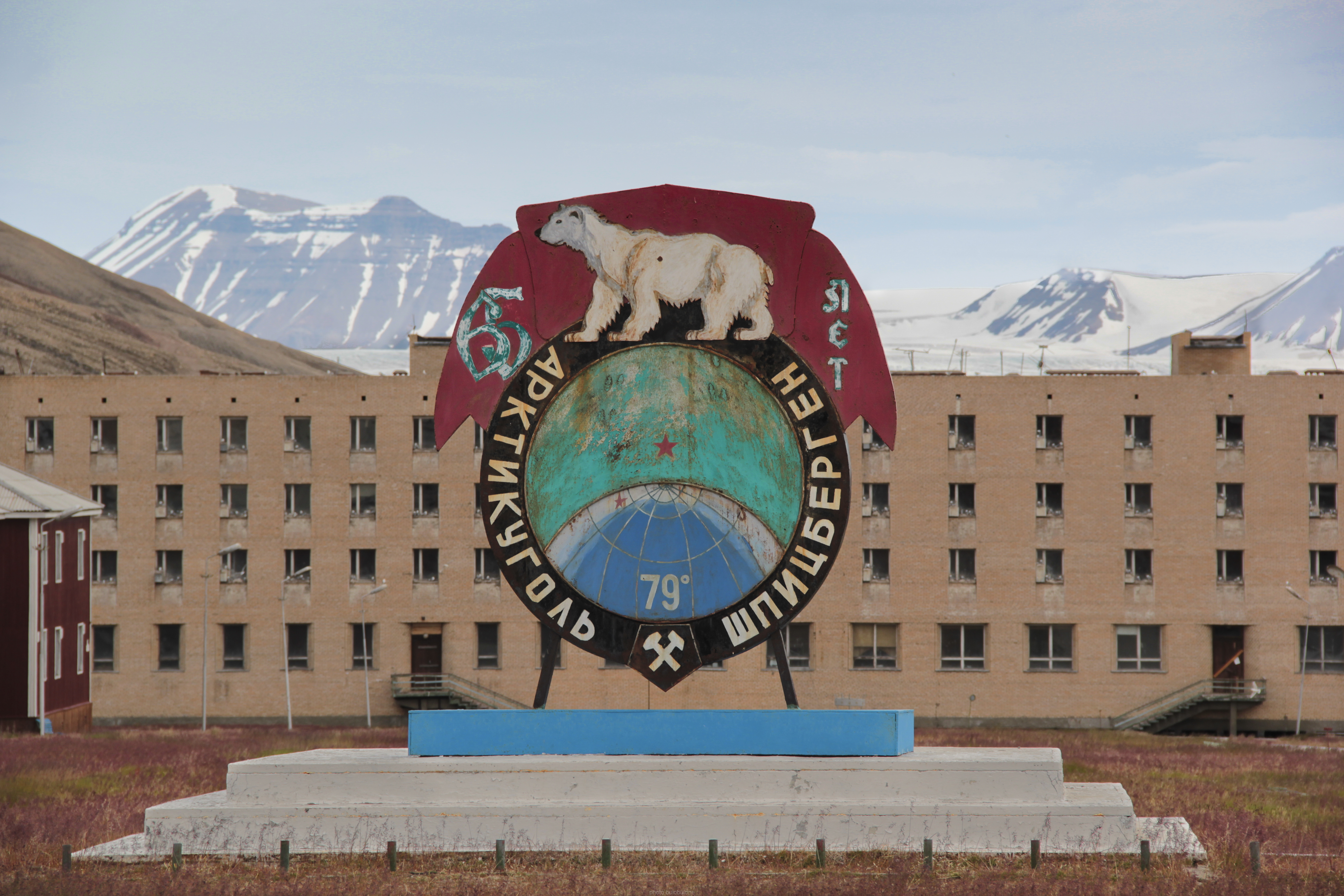
Company sign

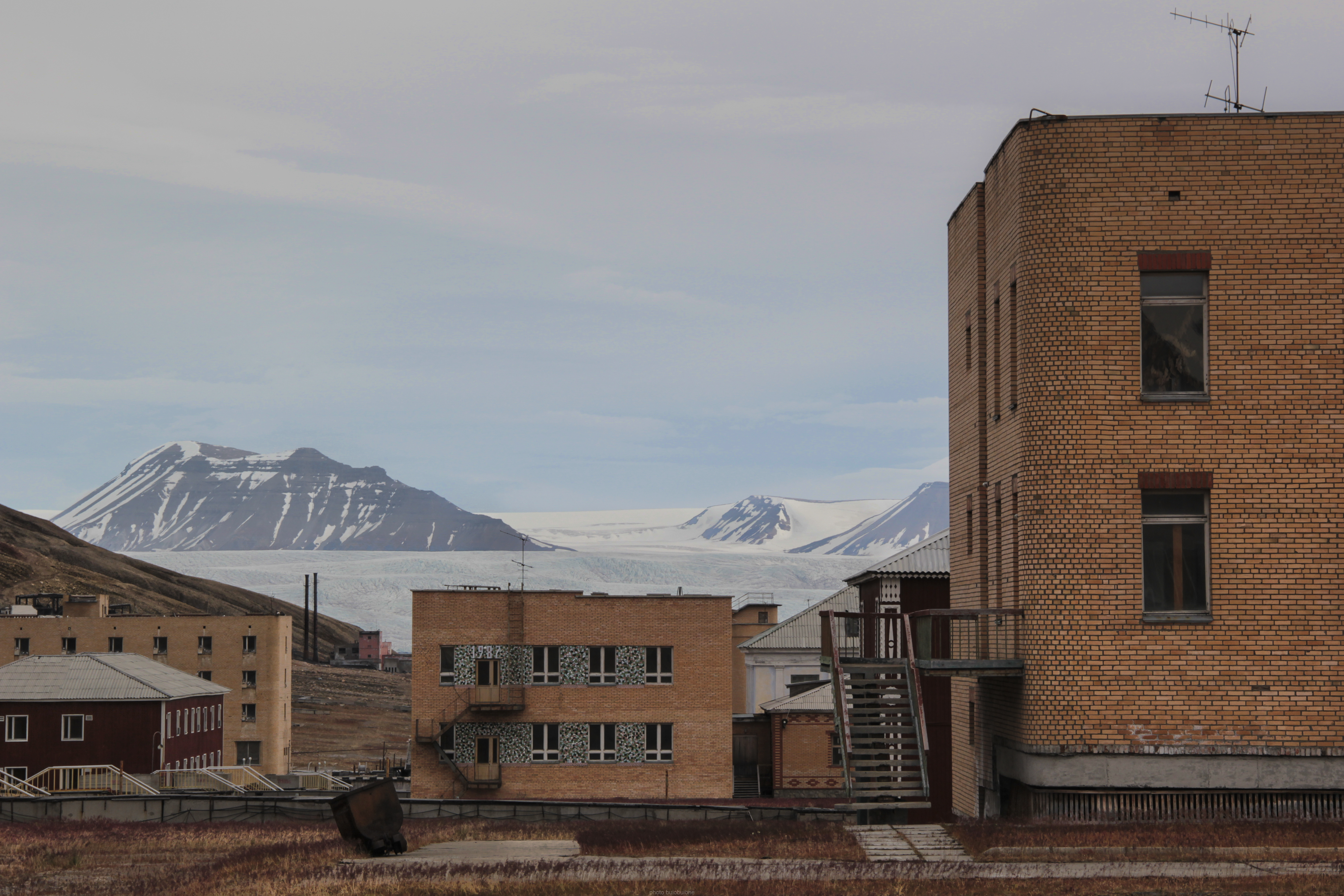
Abandoned buildings

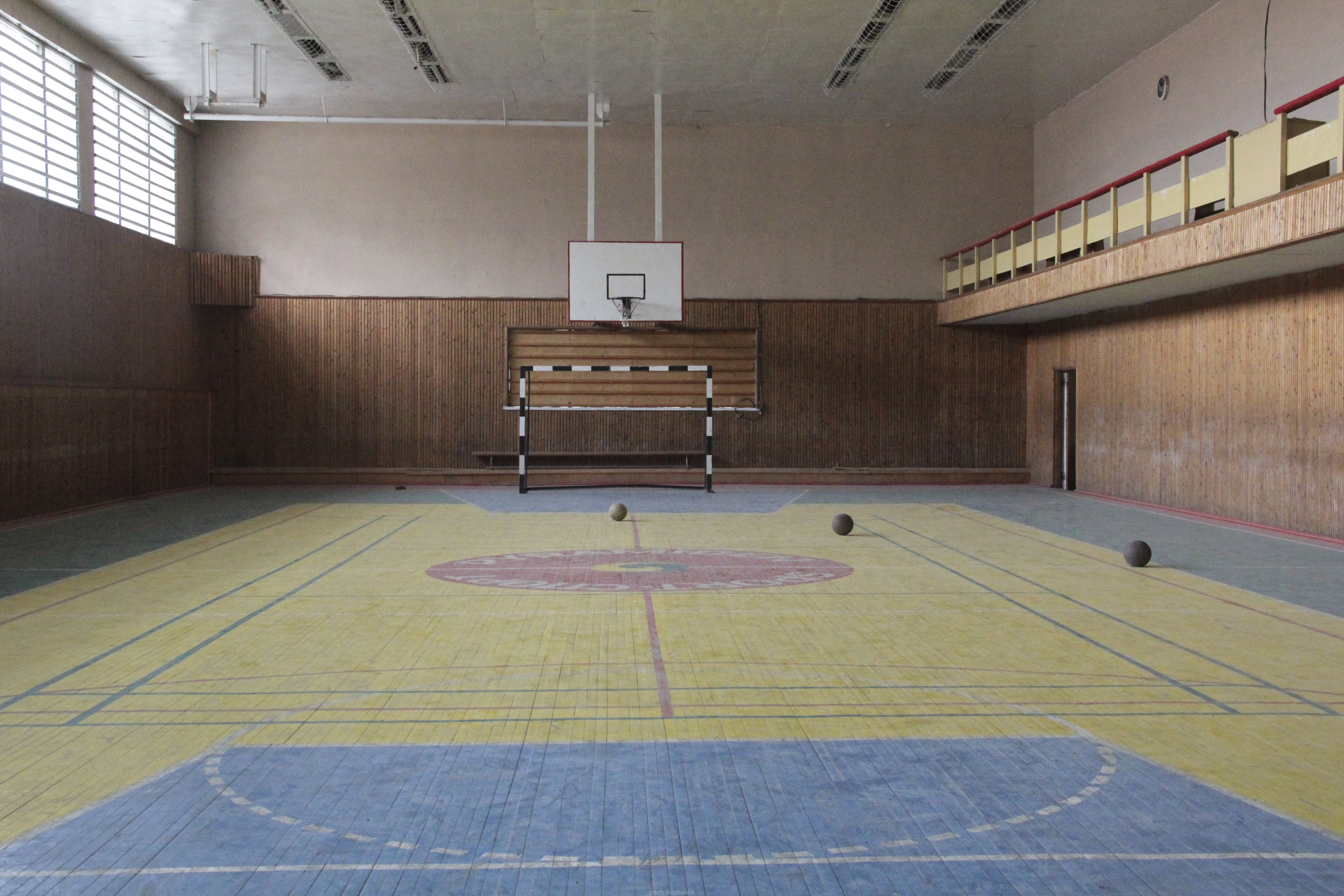
Gym inside the Pyramiden miners' housing complex

Pyramiden (Norwegian: [pʏrɑˈmîːdn̩]; Russian: Пирамида, romanized: Piramida, [pʲɪrɐˈmʲidə]; lit. 'the pyramid') is an abandoned Soviet coal mining settlement on the Norwegian archipelago of Svalbard, which has become a tourist destination. Founded by Sweden in 1910 and sold to the Soviet Union in 1927, Pyramiden was closed in 1998 and has since remained largely abandoned with most of its infrastructure and buildings still in place, the cold climate preserving much of the infrastructure left behind.

Since 2007, there have been efforts to make it a tourist attraction; the town's hotel was renovated and reopened in 2013. In the summer, there is a population of six caretakers.

== History ==
Pyramiden was founded by Sweden in 1910 and sold to the Soviet Union in 1927. It lies at the foot of the Billefjorden on the island of Spitsbergen and is named after the pyramid-shaped mountain with the same name adjacent to the town. The nearest settlements are Svalbard's capital, Longyearbyen, some 50 kilometres (31 mi) to the south, Barentsburg approximately 100 kilometres (62 mi) southwest and the small research community of Ny-Ålesund, 100 kilometres (62 mi) to the west. In Soviet times, the population was mostly Ukrainian, consisting of miners from the Donbas and staff from Volyn.

Owned by the state-owned Russian mining company Arktikugol, which also owns the settlement of Barentsburg, Pyramiden had 2,500 inhabitants in the 1950s. Among its amenities were a cultural centre with a theater, a library, art and music studios; a sports complex; and a cantina open 24 hours a day. It also had a primary school. The northernmost monument to Vladimir Lenin and the northernmost swimming pool were also found here.

In 1996, a charter flight for Arktikugol crashed on the approach to Svalbard Airport with the loss of 141 lives.

Between 1955 and 1998, as much as nine million tonnes of coal were extracted from the mine. Mining ceased on 31 March 1998 and the settlement closed that same year. The last permanent resident departed on 10 October, leaving Pyramiden as a ghost town.

Until 2007, the former settlement remained uninhabited and largely untouched. The buildings' interiors remained largely as they were when the settlement was abandoned. In 2012, Aleksandr Romanovsky became the first person to return to live in Pyramiden. He has since been joined by five others. Romanovsky, a musician and tour guide in the settlement, has called himself the "world's most northern head-banger". Romanovsky has lived for years on his own in this abandoned town.

On 27 August 2019, the world's northernmost film festival was held in Pyramiden, dedicated to the 100th anniversary of Soviet cinema.

In 2022, Russia announced new investment plans to support its presence in Pyramiden and Barentsburg. As of 2026, around 20–30 people, mostly tourism workers, live in the town during summers, while in winter that number shrinks to 1–3 people. There are only two inhabitable buildings: a hotel with a restaurant and a dormitory.

== Preservation ==
Pyramiden is accessible by boat or snowmobile from Longyearbyen, either as part of a guided tour or independently. There is also the Pyramiden Heliport. There are no restrictions on visiting Pyramiden, but visitors are not allowed to enter any buildings without permission even if they are open. While most buildings are now locked, breaking into the buildings, vandalism and theft of artefacts have become a serious threat to Pyramiden as it contributes to the accelerating deterioration of the buildings.

Pyramiden is maintained as a tourist destination by Arctic Travel Company Grumant, a division of Arktikugol. Tours through many buildings are available upon request at the Pyramiden Hotel. The movie theatre has been restored to fully functioning, and movies may now be booked on request. An archive of over 1000 Soviet films is preserved in the storerooms on the site.

Since 2007, Arktikugol has been renovating the hotel and upgrading the infrastructure, including building a new power station with diesel generators, in order to accommodate tourists in the old settlement. Up to 30 workers have been living in the settlement year round to maintain the facilities and guide tourists visiting from Longyearbyen.

The Pyramiden hotel reopened in 2013. The hotel also houses the Pyramiden Museum as well as a post office and a souvenir shop. There was a small hotel built of old shipping containers near the harbour, but this has closed since the hotel is now renovated and open for guests. There are no plans to renovate and reopen the whole settlement.
