= Spark+ =

Spark+ (Спарк+)
IATA	ICAO	Call sign
—	BVV	SPARC
- Founded: 1998
- Ceased operations: 2006
- Hubs: St Petersburg
- Fleet size: 16
- Parent company: SPARC Aircraft Repair Company
- Headquarters: St Petersburg

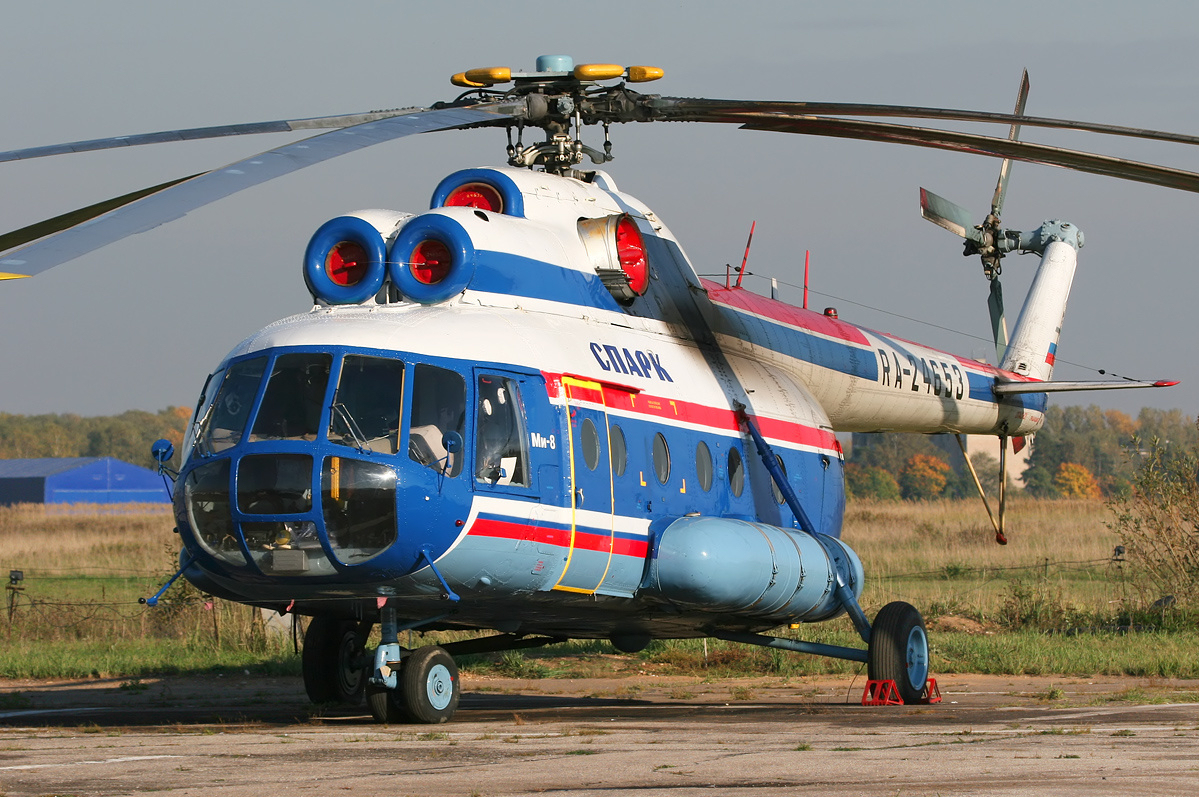
Spark+ Mil Mi-8

Spark+ (Russian Спарк+) (Sparc Avia Zao) was a Russian airline based in St Petersburg and founded in 1998 and is a subsidiary of the SPARC helicopter repair plant. The fleet serves as a shuttle for the coal and petroleum industries as well as transporting people and equipment to and from the North and South Poles. The helicopters are also used to carry out aerial work of various sorts. As of 2005 it was the largest helicopter operator in the North-West of Russia.

The former website was taken down in 2006 and the airline seems not to be operating anymore.

== Fleet ==
Aircraft type	Active	Notes
Mil Mi-8	12	Mi-8, Mi-8T, Mi-8MT, Mi-8AT, Mi-8MTV, Mi-172
Eurocopter AS-350	1	
Antonov An-2	3	
