= Postal codes in Norway =

Norwegian Postal Codes are four-digit codes, known in Norwegian as postnummer (literally 'post number'). Posten, the Norwegian postal service, makes small modifications to the postal code system each year. In 1999, Posten made considerable changes to the postal codes in Norway.

Since 18 March 1968 Norway has used a four-digit system: postnummersystemet. The numbers start at 00 and increase with the distance from the capital city Oslo. The highest post numbers are found in the county of Finnmark, near the Russian border, where they start with 95–99. The lowest post code in use is 0001 (Oslo Municipality), the highest 9991 (Båtsfjord Municipality).

== Postal number regions ==
The first two numbers indicate the geographic location (counties) the postal code belongs to.

- 00–12 Oslo
- 13–14 Akershus
- 15–18 Østfold
- 19–21 Akershus
- 21–29 Innlandet
- 30 Buskerud
- 30–32 Vestfold
- 33–36 Buskerud
- 36–39 Telemark
- 40–44 Rogaland
- 44–49 Agder
- 50–55 Vestland
- 55 Rogaland
- 56–59 Vestland
- 60–66 Møre og Romsdal
- 67–69 Vestland
- 70–79 Trøndelag
- 79–89 Nordland
- 84 Nordland and Troms
- 8099 Jan Mayen
- 90–94 Troms
- 917 Svalbard
- 94 Nordland and Troms
- 95–99 Finnmark
