= List of museums in Svalbard =

This is a list of museums in Svalbard, a Norwegian archipelago in the Arctic Ocean.

- Barentsburg Pomor Museum, located in Barentsburg
- Ny-Ålesund Town and Mine Museum, located in Ny-Ålesund
- Barentsburg Art Arctic Gallery
- Pyramiden Museum, located in Pyramiden
- Spitsbergen Airship Museum, located in Longyearbyen
- Svalbard Museum, located in Longyearbyen

== See also ==
- List of museums
- Tourism in Svalbard
- Culture of Svalbard
