= Pyramiden Museum =

Museum in Svalbard, Norway

Coordinates: 78°39′25″N 16°19′02″E

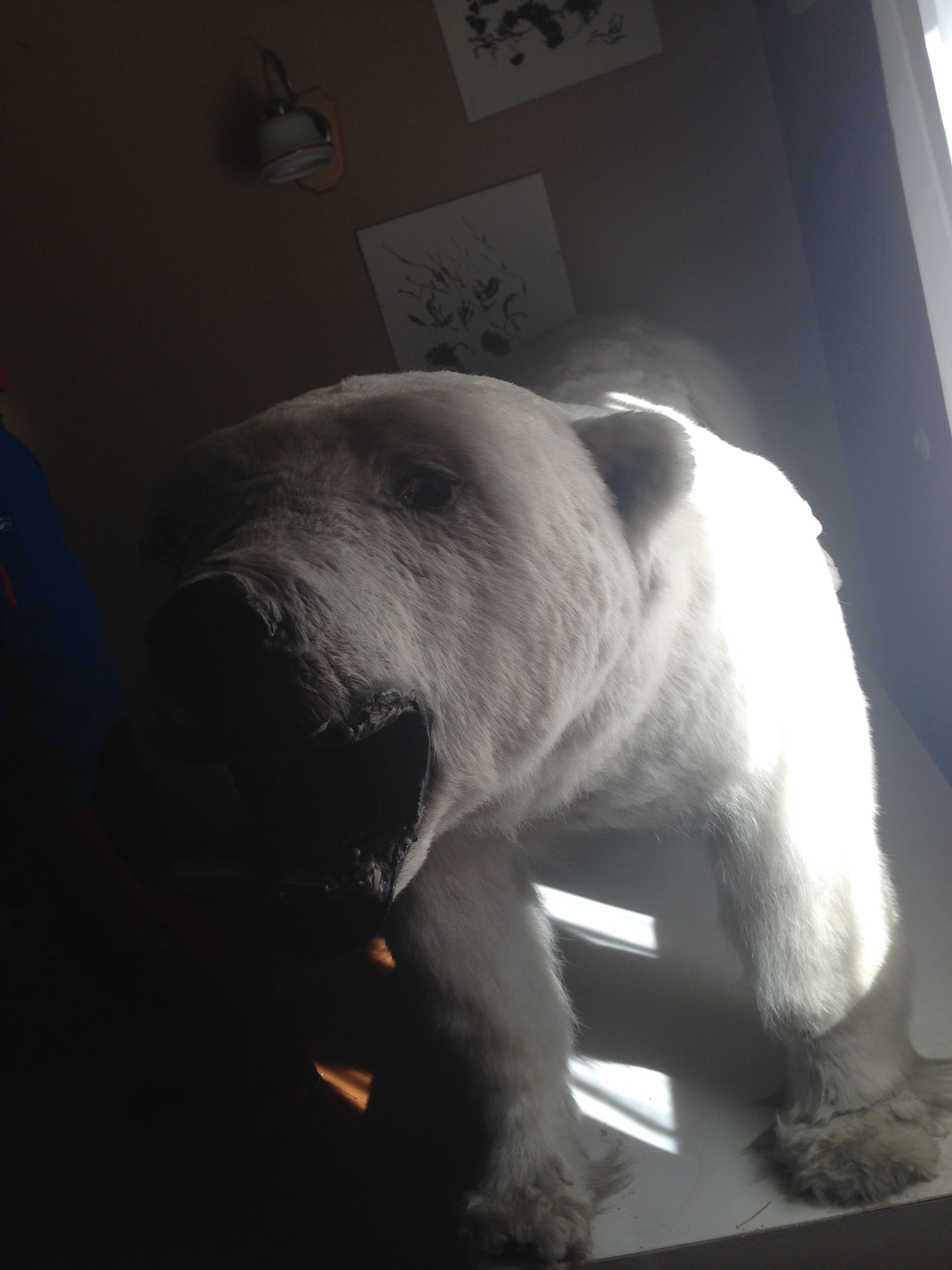
- A stuffed polar bear exhibit at the museum
- Established: 2007
- Location: Pyramiden, Svalbard
- Owner: Trust Arktikugol

The Pyramiden Museum is a small museum located in Pyramiden, an abandoned town in Svalbard, a Norwegian archipelago in the Arctic Ocean. The museum features exhibits on biology and history, for example in the form of taxidermal polar wildlife, geological samples from the surrounding area, a few archaeological artefacts from the Pomors, some information on the coal mining industry, and a slew of Soviet memorabilia.

Located 50 kilometres (31 mi) from the regional capital Longyearbyen, the settlement was founded by Sweden in 1910 and purchased by the Soviet Union (USSR) in 1927. A prominent coal mining settlement, Pyramiden once had a population numbering over a thousand, and a flourishing community. While on Norwegian territory, ruled by the Governor of Svalbard, the Svalbard Treaty of 1920 granted significant freedoms to signatory states in regards to their economic activities.

Pyramiden – like the two other USSR-owned settlements on Spitsbergen, Grumant and Barentsburg – was administered largely without Norwegian insight, and according to Soviet societal norms. Among the facilities found in the town was a museum, a direct predecessor of the currently existing one.

In 1998, a few years after the dissolution of the Soviet Union, Pyramiden – still owned by Trust Arktikugol – was abandoned. For years it remained a ghost town, with only sporadic human activity. Most of the buildings, and the items in them, were left as they were. After over a decade of decay, Arktikugol started renovated the old "Tulip Hotel" in 2007, upgrading the infrastructure over the next few years to accommodate a minor tourist industry. Since then a handful of Russian workers tasked with maintaining the facilities and guiding tourists visiting from Longyearbyen have been living in Pyramiden. In addition to tourist and employee housing, the hotel houses a museum, which shares a room – adjacent from the hotel bar – with a souvenir shop and a postal office.

== See also ==
- Archaeology of Svalbard
- History of Svalbard
- Barentsburg Pomor Museum
