= Barentsburg Pomor Museum =

Museum in Barentsburg, Svalbard, Norway

Coordinates: 78.0650°N 14.2137°E

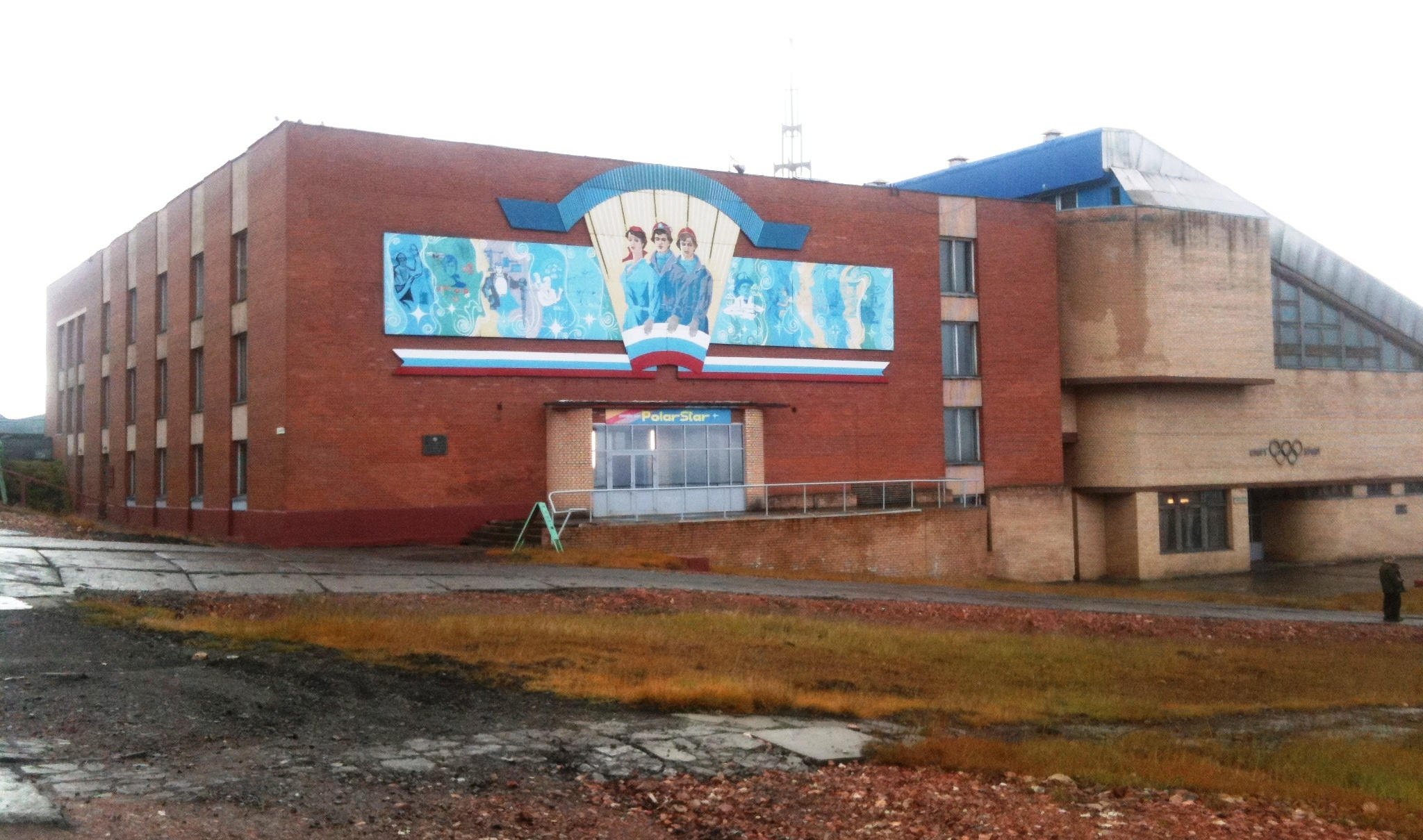
- Established: 1963
- Location: Barentsburg, Svalbard
- Owner: Trust Arktikugol

The Barentsburg Pomor Museum is a small museum located in Barentsburg, a town in Svalbard, a Norwegian archipelago in the Arctic Ocean. Founded during the 1920s by the Dutch, the coal mining settlement was sold to the Soviet Union in 1932, and so it was the USSR which founded the museum in 1963. Today owned entirely by the Government of Russia through Arktikugol, Barentsburg is a shadow of its former self, with only a few hundred inhabitants compared to over a thousand during its heyday. The museum remains intact, however, receiving most of its visitors in the form of tourists. It shares the same building as the town's Sports and Culture Centre.

When formed in 1963, one of the museum's co-founders was Vadim F. Starkov, a Soviet archaeologist from the USSR Academy of Sciences and a prominent figure in the archaeology of Svalbard. The primary subject of the museum is, as the name indicates, the Pomors, inhabitants of the White Sea who feature heavily in the archipelago's history. Starkov held that these hunters were the first discoverers of Svalbard, not Willem Barentsz, a point of view which the museum adheres to as well.

Despite the Russian stance on Willem Barentsz, archaeological finds from his expeditions are featured in the museum's exhibits, as are artefacts recovered from the settlements of the Pomors and other early explorers from the 16th century and onwards. Other things shown in the museum include a large geological collection featuring minerals and fossils, taxidermal polar wildlife, Svalbard-related artwork, and exhibits on Barentsburg's coal mining history, the Second World War, and the Soviet era.

In recent years it has been a minor source of conflict between the Norwegian and Russian governments, in the overall context of territorial claims in the Arctic. The Barentsburg Pomor Museum was closed to the public during the summer of 2008, and conditions were said to be poor. In order to protect them from degradation, Norway's Governor of Svalbard demanded that Pomor historical objects kept in the museum be handed over for preservation in Longyearbyen. This was done citing the Svalbard Environmental Protection Act, because the Svalbard Treaty of 1920 – while granting full economic access to signatory states – does not provide suzerainty in questions of cultural heritage. The Russia-owned Arktikugol refused, due to both a reluctance to accept Norwegian sovereignty over its Arctic holdings and the fact that the artefacts provide historical legitimacy to Russian involvement on Svalbard. Norway eventually let go of the demand.

== See also ==
- Archaeology of Svalbard
- History of Svalbard
- Pyramiden Museum
