= North Pole Expedition Museum =

Topical historical museum in Longyearbyen

Coordinates: 78.2233465°N 15.6534568°E

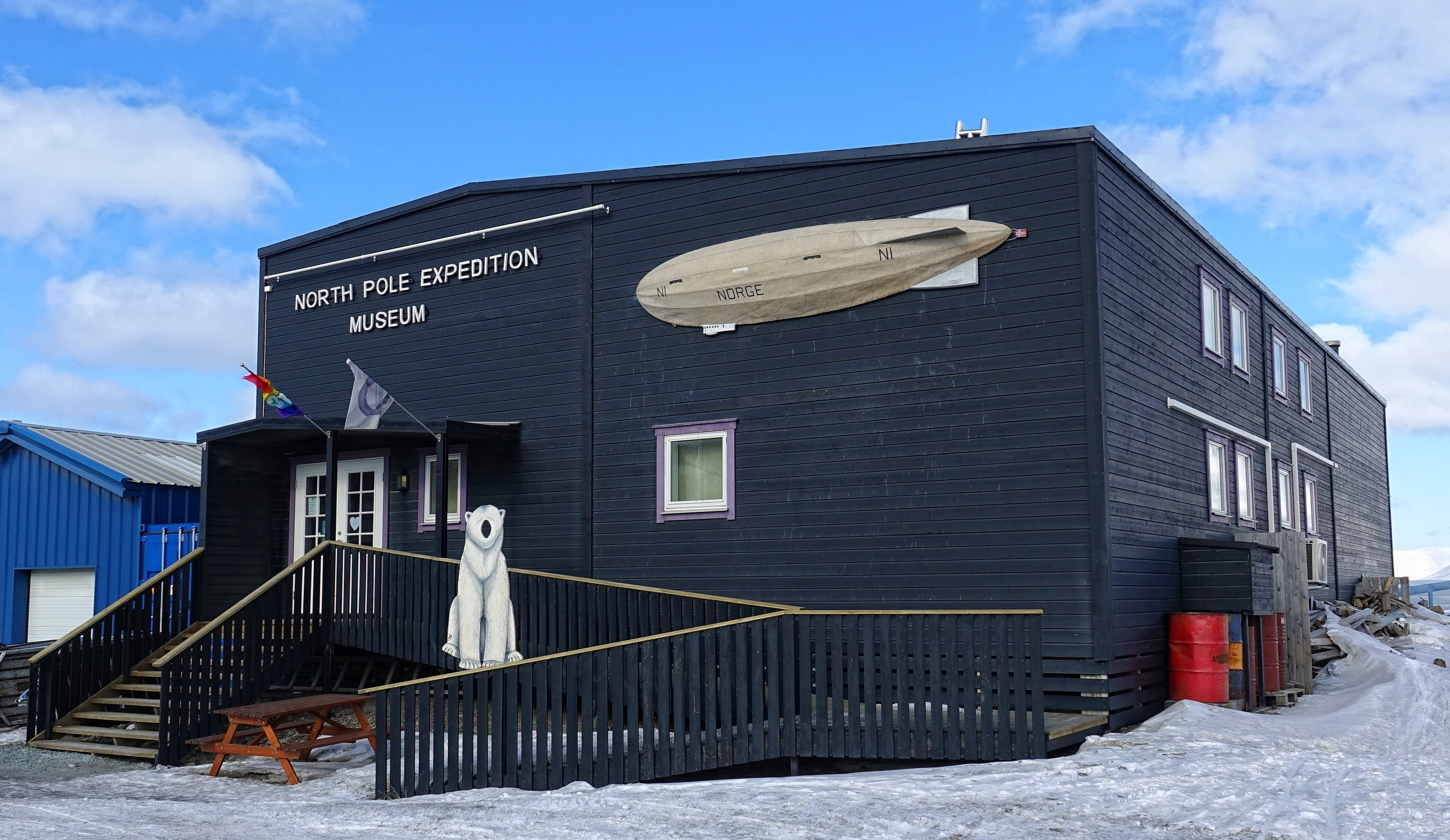
- Established: 2008
- Location: Longyearbyen, Svalbard
- Owner: Independent

The North Pole Expedition Museum (Luftskipsmuseet på Spitsbergen) is a museum located on the island of Spitsbergen in Longyearbyen, the capital of the Arctic Ocean archipelago Svalbard. It was co-founded by the Italian Stefano Poli and the Norwegian Ingunn Løyning. Plans to open the museum began in 2005. Originally a new building was supposed to be built to house the museum, but following a fallout with one of the share-owners in 2007 this idea was scrapped, and instead the Airship Museum was opened in 2008 in Longyearbyen's former pig farm, which previously had housed the Svalbard Museum as well.

The year of opening was chosen due to its significance as the International Polar Year, the 80th anniversary of the Italia's crash, and the 30th anniversary of polar explorer and aviator Umberto Nobile's death. Several descendants of Nobile, and of Roald Amundsen who died during the rescue of the Italia crew, attended the opening ceremony, which was held on 15 November 2008. In July 2012 the museum was relocated, to a newly constructed building closer to central Longyearbyen.

There is a long history of aviation in modern Svalbard, documented by the North Pole Expedition Museum. Exhibits include artefacts from, and information relating to, several major expeditions carried out during the exploration of the Arctic region. Among these exploits are the journeys of airships such as the America (several failed attempts to reach the North Pole, 1906–1909), the Norge (first trip to the North Pole and first flight over the polar cap in 1926), and the Italia (and the subsequent rescue effort following its 1928 crash). Also featured is the 1897 expedition of the balloonist Salomon August Andrée, and the attempts to discover its fate. The museum's collection includes a ribbon granted to Nobile by Benito Mussolini, parts of the Norge logbook, aircraft models, international newspaper clippings, and other various objects connected to the expeditions.

== See also ==
- Archaeology of Svalbard
- History of Svalbard
- List of museums in Svalbard
