= Ny-Ålesund Town and Mine Museum =

Museum in Svalbard, Norway

- Ny-Ålesund By- og Gruvemuseum
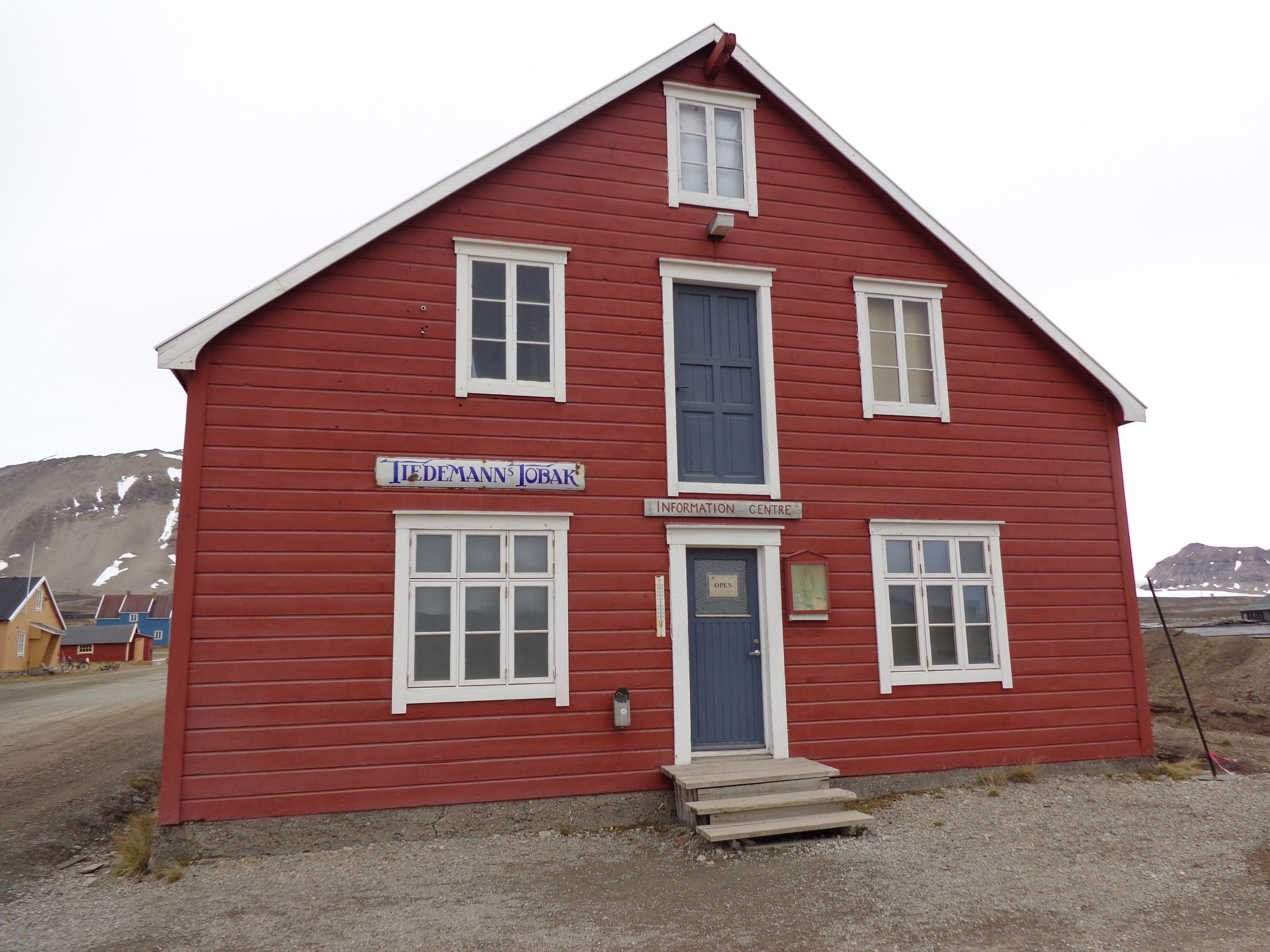
- Established: 1988
- Location: Ny-Ålesund, Svalbard
- Coordinates: 78°55′31″N 11°55′48″E
- Owner: Kings Bay AS

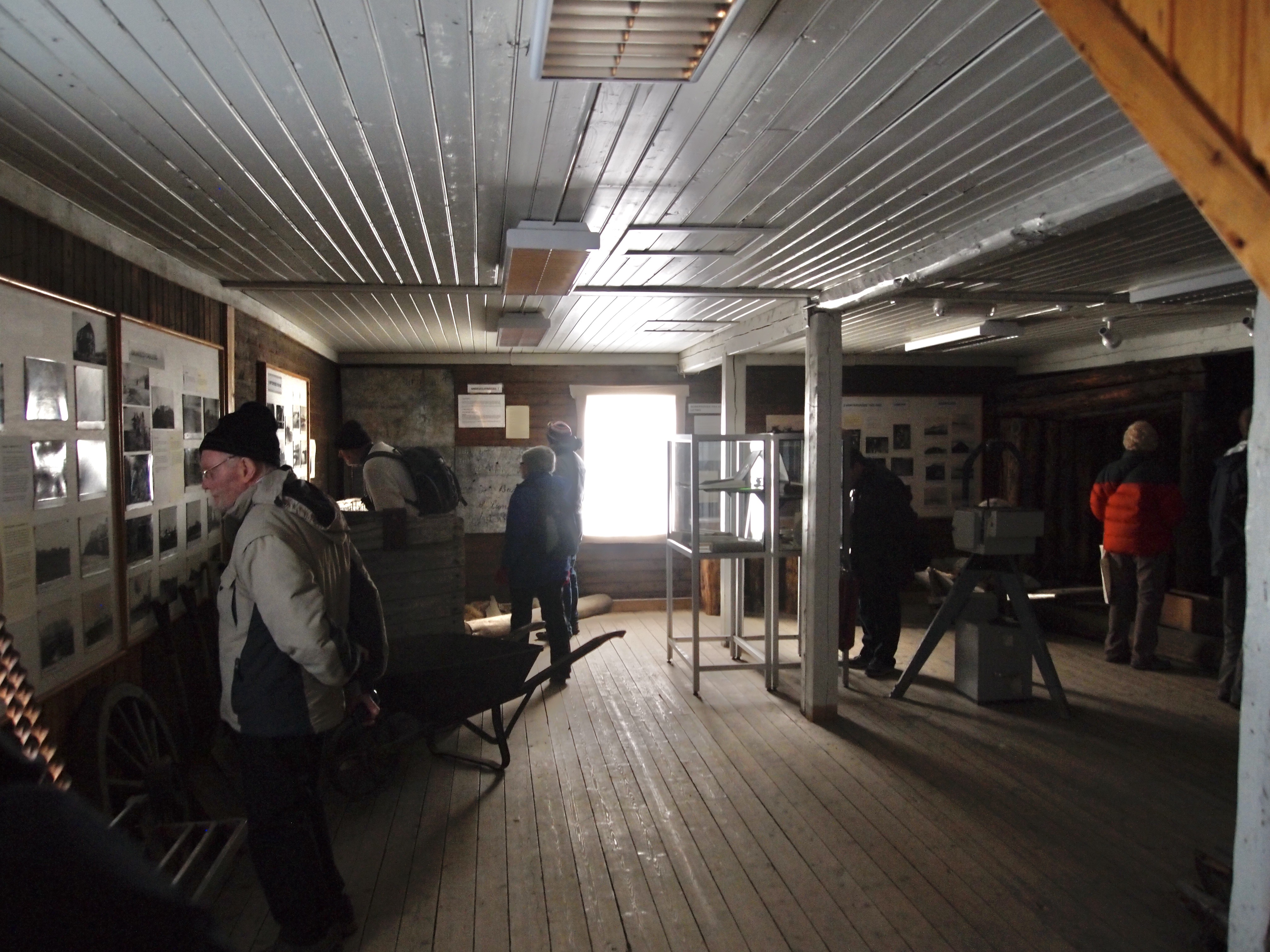
Ny-Ålesund Town and Mine Museum, 2011

The Ny-Ålesund Town and Mine Museum (Norwegian: Ny-Ålesund By- og Gruvemuseum) is a museum located in Ny-Ålesund, a town on Spitsbergen, the central island of the Norwegian archipelago Svalbard in the Arctic Ocean. While some sources claim that the more well known Svalbard Museum holds the position, the museum is the world's northernmost by virtue of Ny-Ålesund's position to the far north of the regional capital Longyearbyen.

Formerly a coal mining settlement until a series of serious accidents (including a final one in 1962) closed down the mine, Ny-Ålesund – which dates back to the first decades of the 20th century – has been a centre of international Arctic and polar research in recent years, housing scientific bases such as the Arctic Yellow River Station and the Himadri Station, belonging to China and India respectively. The area is administrated by Kings Bay, a government-owned company.

The museum is housed in a building constructed in 1917, originally for storage. It was eventually converted into the town store in 1920. The museum was created long afterwards, in 1988, and the building has remained in use as such since. The exterior of the wooden structure has been largely preserved, due to its cultural heritage values. The interior has gone through several redevelopments and improvements. In 2009 a new information centre was opened in the building alongside the museum, providing an introduction to the environmental research going on in the area. In 2011 Kings Bay received significant funds from the Svalbard Environmental Protection Fund for a project to modernize the museum and its exhibitions, scheduled for completion in the Summer of 2014. Things featured in the remodelled museum, which is unstaffed for the most part, include exhibits on the history of Ny-Ålesund since the site was first visited in the 1600s, the coal mining industry, the 1962 accident, early aviation on Svalbard, the scientific research carried out in Ny-Ålesund, and the settlement's society and culture.

== See also ==
- Archaeology of Svalbard
- History of Svalbard
- List of museums in Svalbard
