= Coles Bay =

Coles Bay may refer to:

- Coles Bay, Tasmania, Australia
- Coles Bay, British Columbia is located in North Saanich on the Saanich Peninsula
- Colesbukta, a bay at Spitsbergen, Svalbard, Norway
  - Colesbukta, the port of Grumant

== See also ==
- Cole Bay, Saskatchewan, Canada
