= Colesdalen =

Valley of Spitsbergen, Norway

Coordinates: 78°05′12″N 15°08′00″E

Colesdalen is a valley in Nordenskiöld Land at Spitsbergen, Svalbard. The valley debouches into the bay Colesbukta, at the southern side of Isfjorden.

Colesdalen is located north of the Nordenskiöld Land National Park, but not included in the park, due to mining interests.

The Coleselva River flows through the valley.

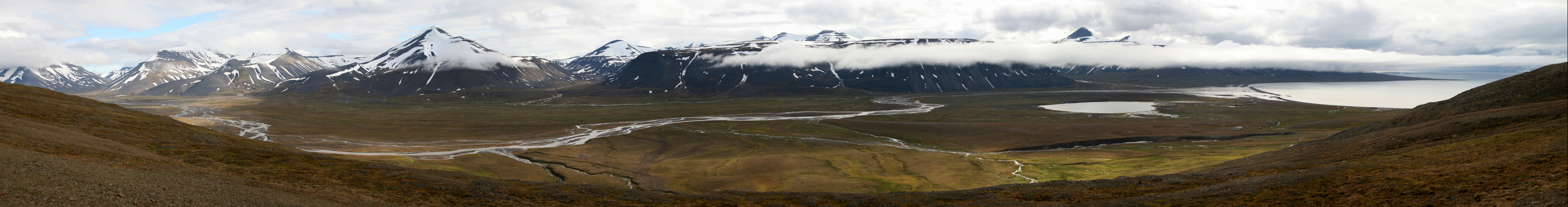
Colesdalen, with Colesbukta to the right.
