= Coleselva =

Location
- Country: Norway
- Archipelago: Svalbard

Physical characteristics
- Mouth
  - coordinates: 78°06′N 15°00′E

Coleselva is a river in Svalbard, Norway. It runs through the Colesdalen Valley. The river empties into the fjord.

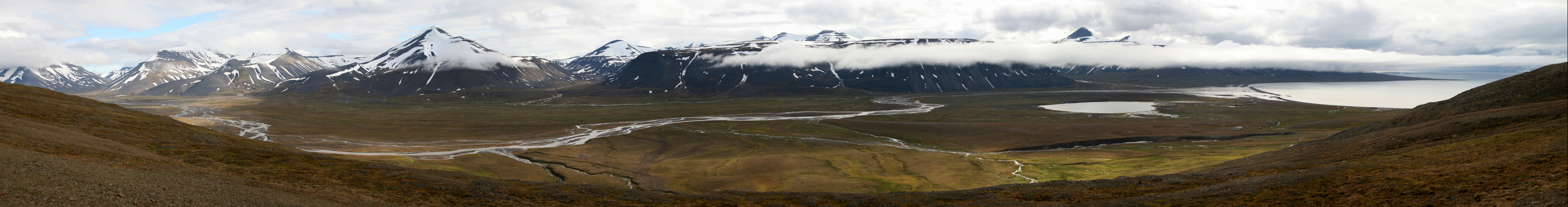
Coleselva River running through the valley emptying into the fjord
