= Arktikugol =

Russian state-owned coal mining corporation in Svalbard

- Type: Federal State Unitary Enterprise
- Industry: Mining
- Founded: 1931
- Headquarters: Moscow, Russia
- Area served: Svalbard
- Products: Coal
- Revenue: 419,159,000 Russian ruble (2017)
- Operating income: −596,681,000 Russian ruble (2017)
- Net income: −6,865,000 Russian ruble (2017)
- Total assets: 1,961,415,000 Russian ruble (2017)
- Parent: Government of Russia
- Website: www.arcticugol.ru

Arktikugol (Russian: Арктикуголь, lit. 'Arctic Coal') is a Russian coal mining unitary enterprise which operates on the island of Spitsbergen in Svalbard, Norway. Owned by the government of Russia, Arktikugol currently performs limited mining in Barentsburg. It has carried out mining operations in the towns of Pyramiden and Grumant, which it still owns, and once operated a port at Colesbukta. The company is headquartered in Moscow and is the official agency through which Russia, and previously the Soviet Union, exercised its Svalbard policy.

The company was established on 7 October 1931 to take over all Soviet mining interests on Svalbard. At the time Grumant and Pyramiden were bought, although only Grumant was in operation. It also bought Barentsburg from Dutch interests. The company retained operation there and in Grumant until 1941, when all employees were evacuated to the mainland as part of Operation Gauntlet. Mining resumed in 1947 and commenced in Pyramiden in 1955. Declining coal deposits resulted in Grumant being closed in 1961.

From the 1960s through the 1980s, Arktikugol carried out a series of oil drilling attempts on the archipelago but never succeeded at finding profitable reservoirs. From the 1990s, the company lost many of its subsidies and cut production, resulting in Pyramiden being closed in 1998. The company has attempted to diversify without success.

== History ==
=== Background ===
The first Russian expedition exploring Svalbard for coal was conducted by Vladimir Alexandrovitch Rusanov in 1912. It explored the areas around Bellsund and van Mijenfjorden. It later went northwards to Isfjorden and visited Grønfjorden and Adventfjorden, and it occupied a claim at Colesbukta on 7 August. On 16 March 1913 the financiers of the expedition established the company Handelshuset Grumant – A. G. Agafeloff & Co. to exploit the mine. They sent an expedition that summer and started breaking coal at Colesbukta with a force of 25 men. In 1920 The Anglo Russian Grumant Company Ltd. was established to purchase the operations at Grumant, the mining town which grew up at Colesbukta. At the time a challenge for the Russian interests on Spitsbergen was that the Soviet Union was not yet party to the Svalbard Treaty.

In 1925 the company sold its rights around Kvalvågen and Agarddhbukta to Severoles, which created the Moscow-based company Russki Grumant Ltd. It issued a series of claims to the Commissioner of Mines, most of which were contested by the Government of Norway and various mining companies. A particular intense issue was that of what would become the settlement of Pyramiden on Billefjorden. Both Svenska Stenkolsaktiebolaget Spetsbergen and Severoles claimed the area. In a settlement, Severoles was given the claims to Pyramiden. The Government of Norway protested, stating that a foreign state could not claim land on Svalbard. Thus Russki Grumant took over the claims. By 1927 all Russian claim disputes were resolved.

The Russian authorities announced on 22 June 1931 that the company Sojusljesprom would be operating Grumant. The first shipment of crew arrived on 12 July. Work started immediately to build a settlement, while a port was to be built at Colesbukta, 5 kilometers (3 mi) away. The first season was regarded as a trial. On 17 November 1931 The Anglo Russian Grumant Co. sold all its mining claims to the newly established Arktikugol. The company had been incorporated on 7 October the same year and had its head office in Moscow.

=== Pre–Second World War ===
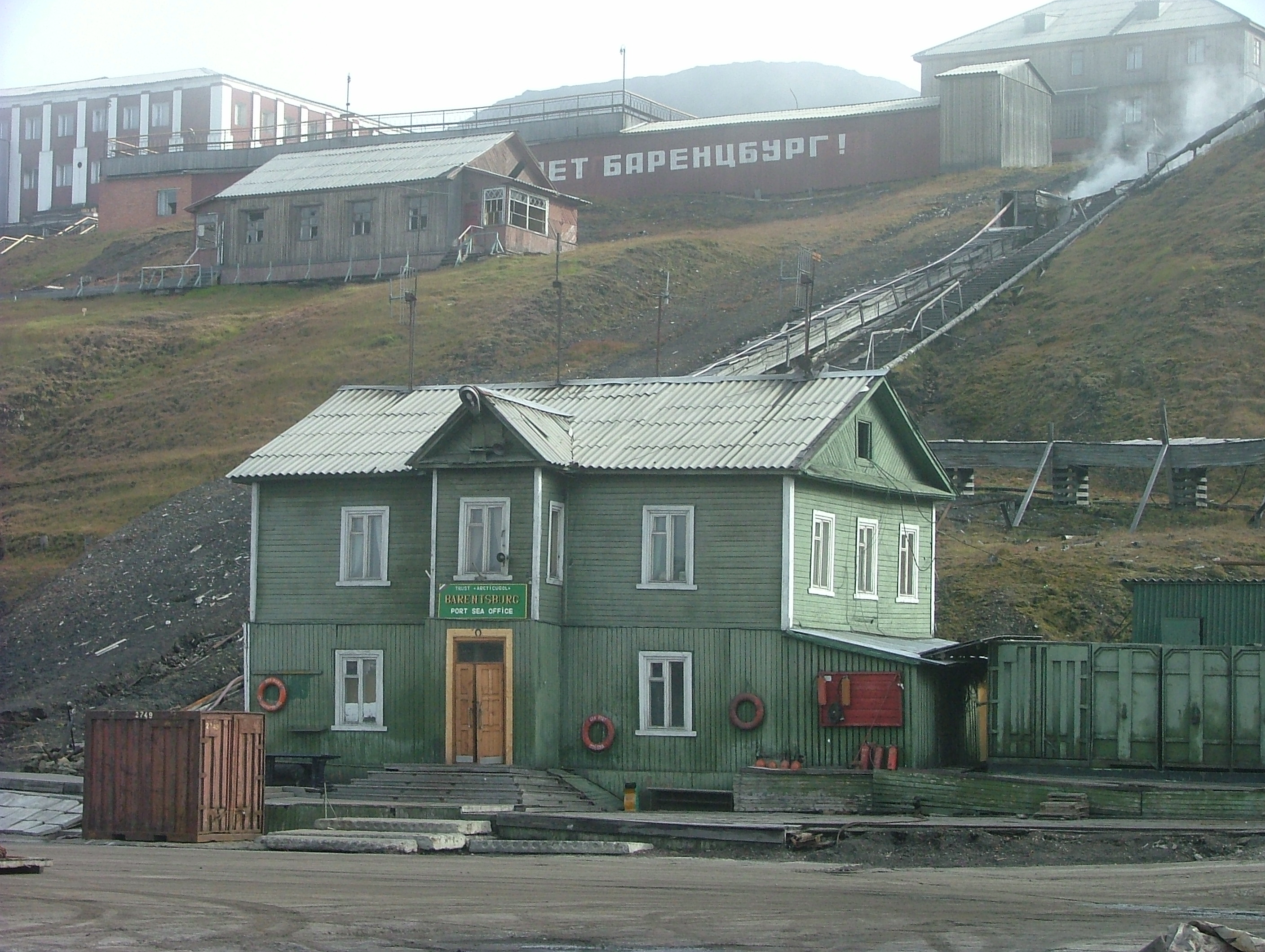
Barentsburg Harbor

Barentsburg was established by the Nederlandsche Spitsbergen Compagnie, who closed operations in 1926. The company announced in 1931 that the town was for sale, and Arktikugol offered to purchase the entire company. Barentsburg was sold on 25 July 1932, including the claims and land at Bohemanflya. When purchasing Grumant, the Russian company had agreed to forfeit its right to operate a long-distance radio station. This arrangement did not apply to Barentsburg, allowing Arktikugol to establish a telegraphy station there. The issue was raised to a diplomatic level, but resolved itself after it became clear that Grumant Radio would only be relaying via Barentsburg. Arktikugol continued to build infrastructure in Grumant and mined ca. 10,000 tonnes of coal in the winter of 1931–32.

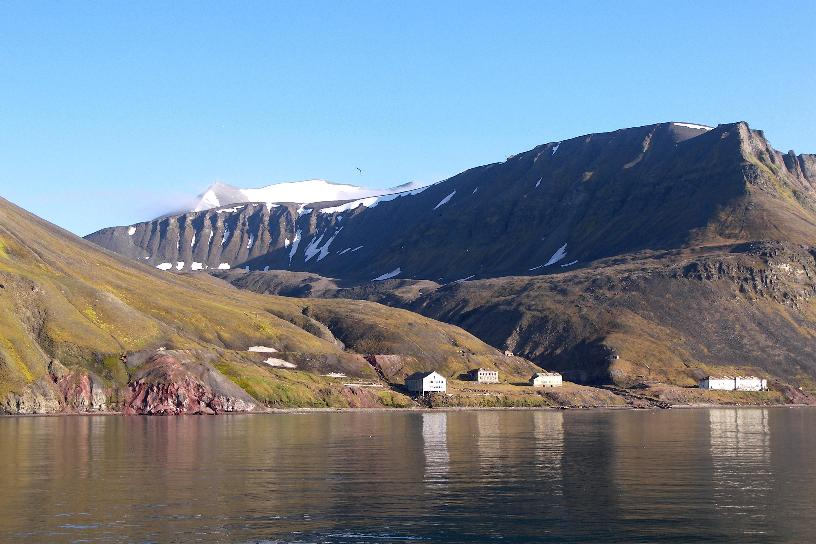
The remains of Grumant

By 1932 the population had reached 300 in Grumant and 500 in Barentsburg. The company had commenced prospecting in Colesbukta, and hoped to bring production to 120,000 tonnes from Grumant and 300,000 tonnes from Barentsburg per year. The Governor of Svalbard conducted the first inspection of the two towns in July 1933. By the winter of 1933–34 the population of Barentsburg had risen to 1,261, including about 100 children. The summer population was about 1,500, and the mines produced 180,000 tonnes in 1934. The same year Grumant had 230 employees and produced 38,000 tonnes. The following year production increased to 349,000 tonnes for both towns.

Meanwhile, Arktikugol was working on prospecting at Pyramiden. Prospects were carried out at Kapp Heer during the winter of 1938–39, concluding with that there was only a single seam of coal. Barentsburg had a population of 1515 in 1939, of which 259 were women and 65 were children. Grumant had a population of 399, of which 56 were women and 12 children. By 1939 a town and mining complex was under construction at Pyramiden. Production started in 1940, with a crew of 80 men.

The break-out of the Second World War initially had little influence on the operations. Norwegian and British authorities agreed on 12 August that all Allied settlements on Svalbard would be evacuated. Operation Gauntlet was initiated, with the troop carrier Empress of Canada arriving on 25 August. It evacuated the entire Soviet population and brought them to the mouth of the Northern Dvina River. Four days later it evacuated the Norwegian settlements. Key infrastructure, such as docks and power stations, were destroyed and the coal heaps set ablaze. The goal was to hinder German operation while making resuming of operation easy. On 8 September 1943 the German Wehrmacht carried out Operation Zitronella, whereby all the settlements on Isfjorden, including Barentsburg and Grumant, were destroyed by fire from the battleships Tirpitz and Scharnhorst and nine destroyers.

=== Cold War ===
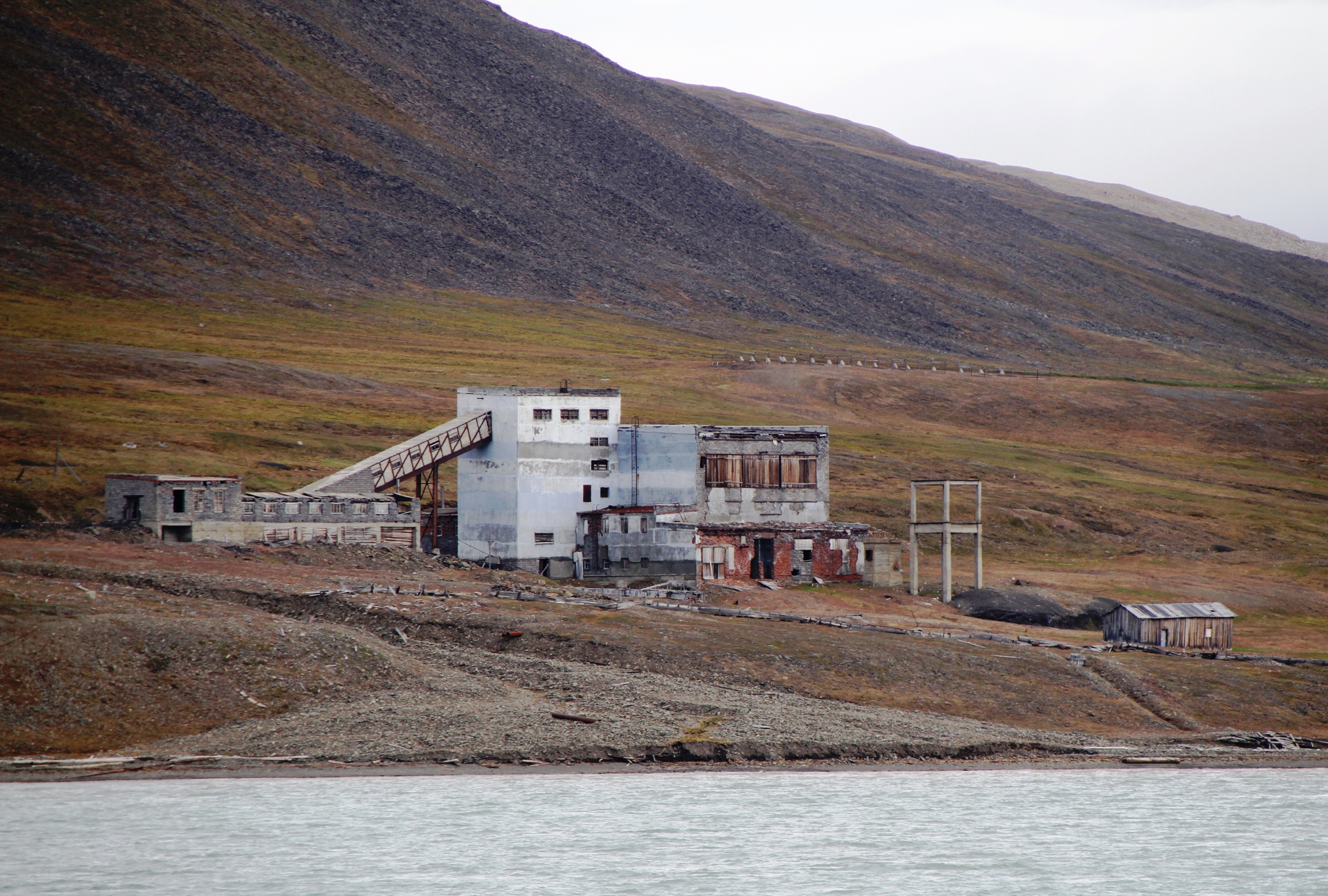
Remains of the coal handling facilities at the port in Colesbukta

By the end of the war the settlement in Pyramiden was still standing. Barentsburg and Kapp Heer were destroyed and full reconstruction of the town was necessary. Grumant was in the same situation. The only structure that was usable was a water tower. Although an inspection was carried out in 1945, Arktikugol did not commence reconstruction until November 1946. It stationed an ice-breaker in Pyramiden to keep an ice-free path between the two towns. By the summer of 1947 there were 350 people working in Pyramiden, although mining had yet to commence. By November the populations had reached 500 in Pyramiden and Barentsburg, and 200 in Grumant. Barentsburg and Grumant were sufficiently rebuilt by 1948 to allow mining to commence. Prospecting was carried out in Colesbukta and by 1949 there were 2,438 Soviet citizens on the archipelago, of which 51 were children. Barentsburg had 1,180 people, Grumant 965 and Pyramiden 293.

At the end of the war there was established a Soviet consulate in Pyramiden. It was moved to Barentsburg in 1950. A new dock, allowing 10,000-tonnes ships, was built in Colesbukta. Meanwhile, a railway line was being built between Grumant and Colesbukta, to allow the Grumant coal to be shipped out from the better port at Colesbukta. The Commissioner of Mines carried out annual inspections of all mines each summer. For the first time, Arktikugol attempted, in violation of the Mining Code, to hinder such an inspection on 10 July 1952. Arktikugol had also initiated simple 140-square-meter (1,500 sq ft) building at Kapp Boheman and broken 4,000 tonnes of coal. That year the mines in Barentsburg produced 130,000 tonnes and 122,000 tonnes were produced in Grumant.

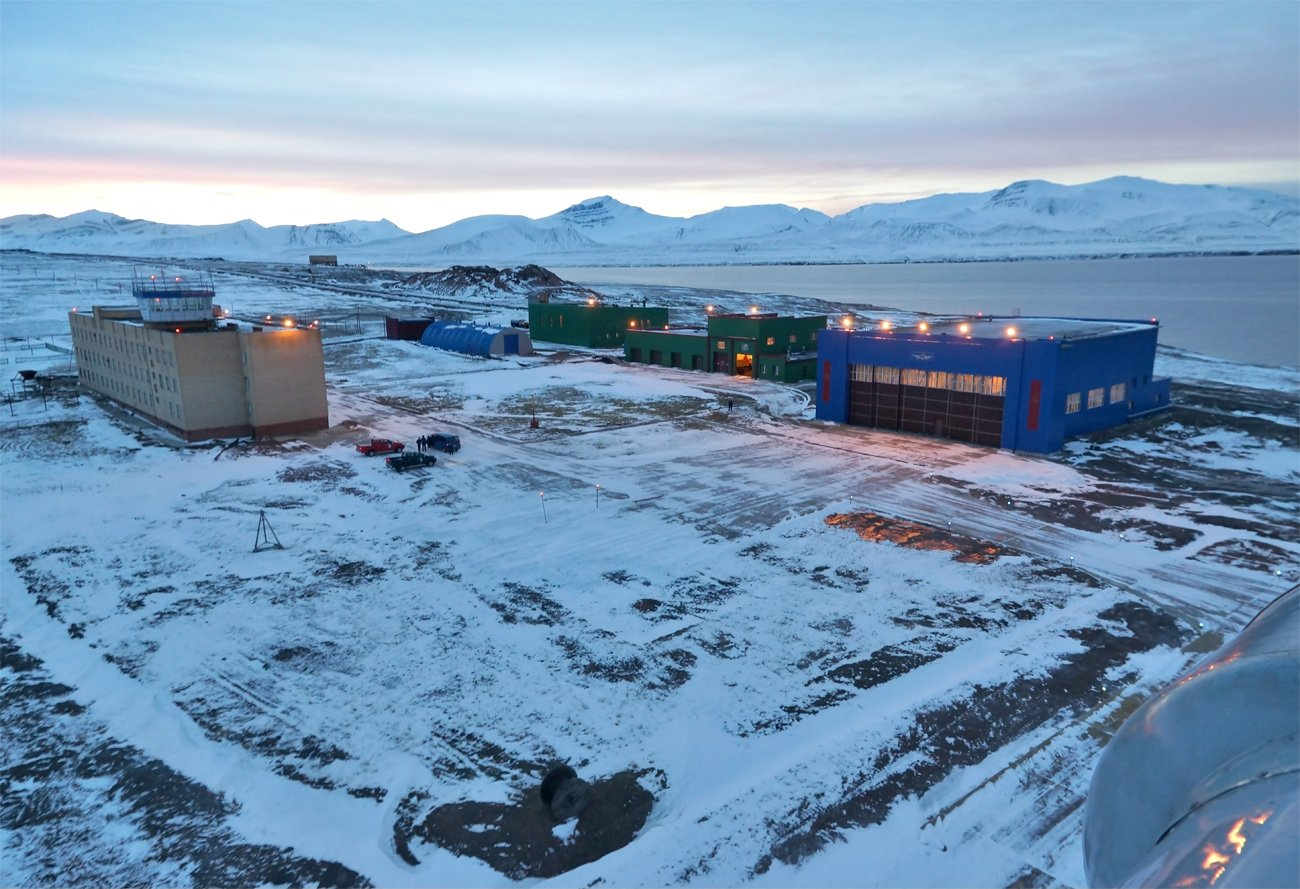
Barentsburg Heliport, Heerodden

Production in Pyramiden commenced in 1955, with an output of 38,000 tonnes the first year. Two years later production there reached 107,000 tonnes, exceeding that of Grumant, at 93,000 tonnes. Along with Barentsburgs 193,000 tonnes, Arktikugols annual production reached 394,000 tonnes. The population in Pyramiden had reached 728, while it was 965 in Grumant and 1,039 in Barentsburg. Arktikugol built a new power station at Colesbukta, but the quality of the coal mined at Grumant was diminishing. The company therefore decided to terminate operations there from the fall of 1961 and abandon the settlements in Grumant and Colesbukta. In its final full year of production, in 1960, Grumant contributed with 125,000 tonnes of coal towards Arktikugol's total 480,000 tonnes. Grumant produced 73,000 tonnes in 1961, and featured a population 1,047 in 1959. The closing of Grumant resulted of a significant fall in the Russian population, from 2,667 people in 1960 to 1,700 in 1965. However, Arktikugol retained a small workforce at Grumant until 1967.

The American oil company Caltex and later Norsk Polar Navigasjon commenced oil prospecting on Svalbard in 1960. This caught the interest of Soviet authorities, who started working on their own petroleum prospecting plans from 1962. Arktikugol was at the time not making any money from the coal mining, and it saw advantages of establishing an alternative, potentially more profitable industry. As in coal mining, the Svalbard Treaty hindered any non-discrimination compared with other country's economic activities. The company registered 71 petroleum claims in January 1963, based on geological indications. At the time there was uncertainty is this was sufficient, or if samples would need to be provided for the claims to be approved. The claims were rejected in May, but was met with protests as the Soviet Union claimed they were being discriminated against in comparison with Caltex. The issue received a temporary closing on 17 July 1965, when Arktikugol accepted to pay royalties on any production.

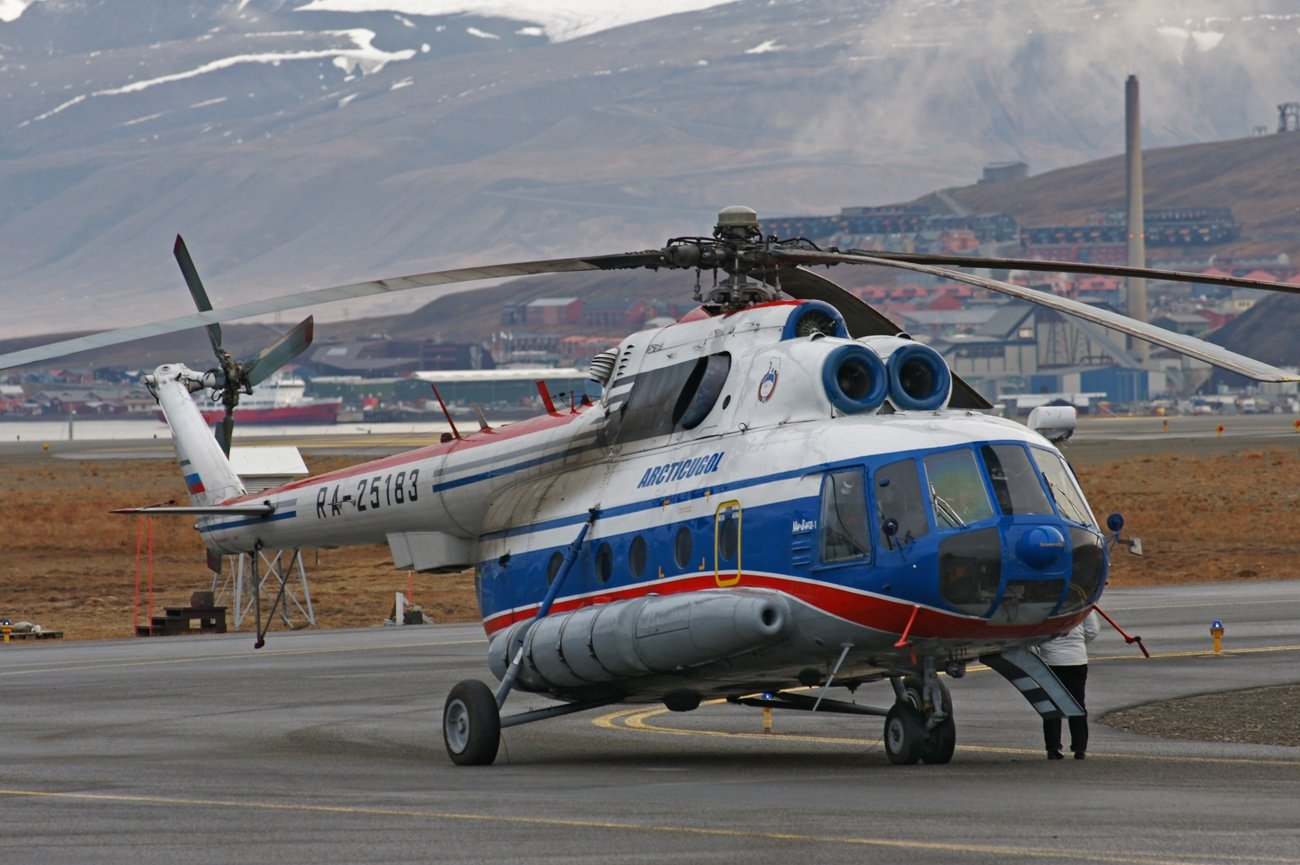
Mil Mi-8 at Svalbard Airport, Longyear

Svalbard Airport, Longyear opened on 2 September 1975. An agreement is made so that Arktikugol can fly its workers to the mainland via the airport with Aeroflot. The airline also starts operating a helicopter shuttle service between Longyearbyen and Barentsburg with the construction of Barentsburg Heliport, Heerodden. A Soviet helicopter crashed at Hansbreen in August 1977, although no-one was killed. Norwegian authorities give an operating permit to the heliport in 1978. Arktikugol commenced prospecting in Colesbukta from 1981 and 1988, and between 40 and 50 people were quartered in the abandoned town in the summers. The company experience another helicopter accident, at Hornsund, in 1982.

Arktikugol carried out oil drilling at Vassdalen at van Mijenfjorden from 1985 to 1989. The company opened new cultural centers, both including 25-meter (82 ft) swimming pools, in Barentsburg and Pyramiden in 1987. A hotel was opened in Pyramiden in 1989 and the company started initiatives to attract tourists to the town. That year there were 715 residents in Pyramiden and 918 in Barentsburg.

=== Post-dissolution ===
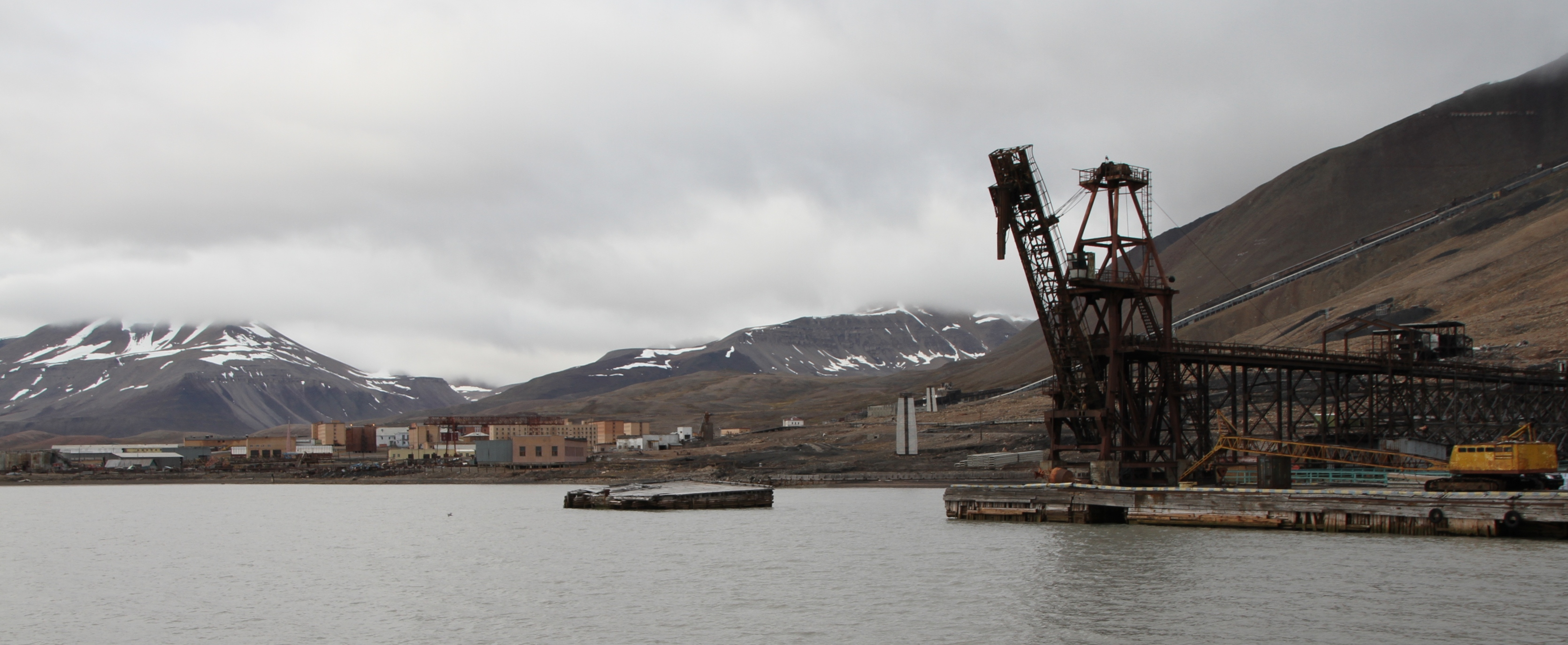
The port facilities in Pyramiden

With the dissolution of the Soviet Union in 1991, Deputy Foreign Minister Andrei Fyodorov stated that the Russian state no longer had any interests in remaining in Svalbard. Reforms in the coal industry were a priority and on 30 December 1992 Boris Yeltsin announced the coal industry's privatization and that subsidies would cease from 1994. Arktikugol was as an exception allowed to continue with subsidies and with state ownership. However, the company no longer was to sell coal to Russia, but instead to Western Europe. This would allow the company access to hard currency, although the coal's poor quality and high sulfur content gave low prices. Production at this point amounted to ca. 400,000 tonnes per year, of which about a fifth went to local consumption.

The company started looking for alternative sources of revenue. It was inspired by Longyearbyen, which was carrying out a diversification process. Arktikugol announced several plans, including opening for tourism and converting one of the residential apartment buildings to a hotel; establishing a tourist market; plans for bottling water and plans for the construction of a fishing station. An application for tourist flights with the Mi-8 helicopters was sent, but rejected by the Governor of environmental and safety reasons. The hotel received few visitors. Surveying in Pyramiden commenced in 1990 and concluded in 1996.

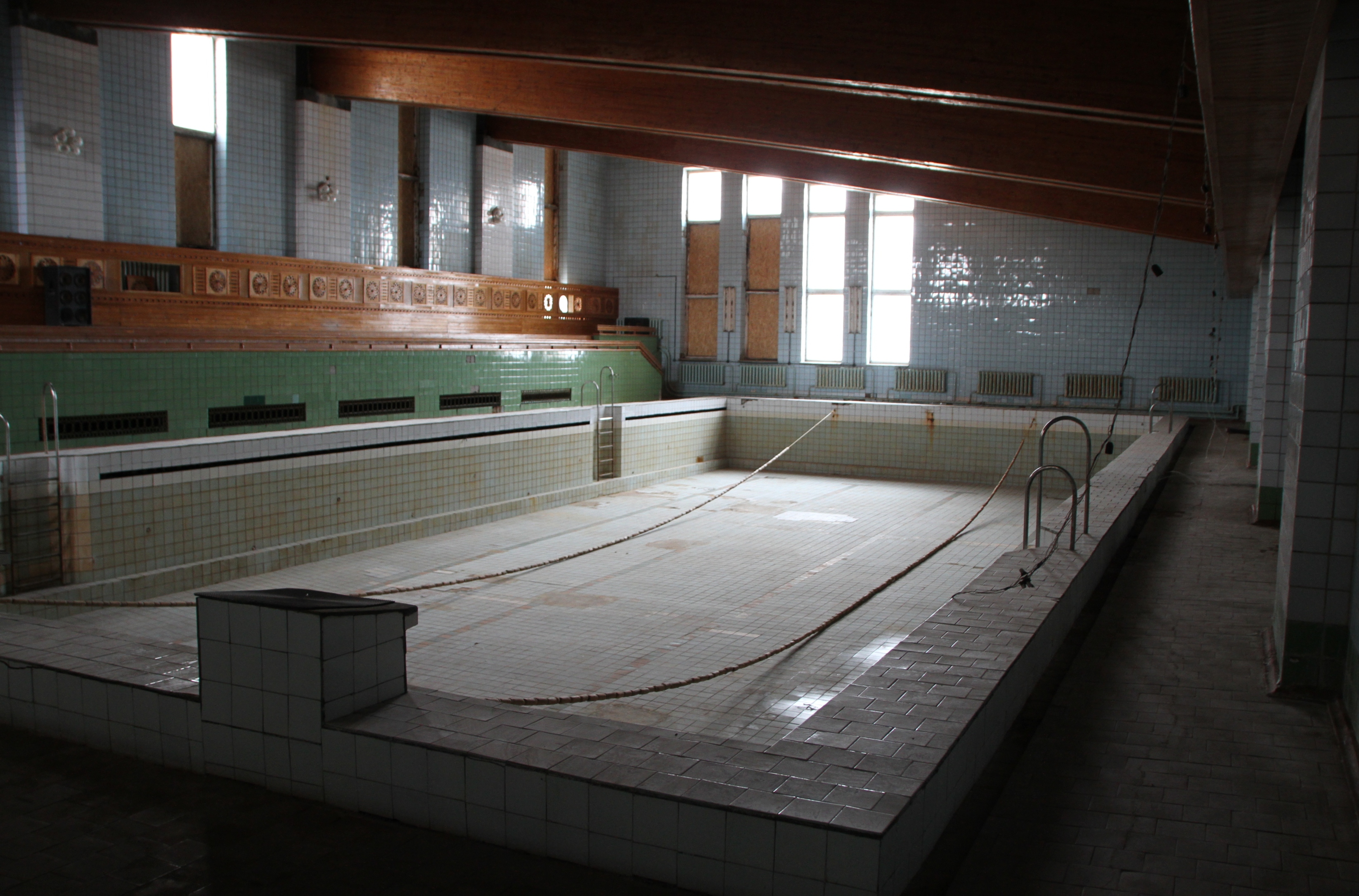
Arktikugol built a wide arrange of cultural services for its employees, such as swimming pools

Without sufficient income, the company was forced to cut its welfare services. Maintenance was cut to a minimum, and in 1995 the schools and kindergartens were closed and children and most wives returned to the mainland. Both towns became dominated by young men. The Arktikugol-chartered Vnukovo Airlines Flight 2801 crashed into Operafjellet on 29 August 1996, killing all 141 people on board. All of the passengers were Arktikugol employees. On 18 September 1997, twenty-three miners were killed in an explosion—the most deadly mining accident ever on Norwegian soil. In the first accident the Russians sent their own rescue crew and equipment and proposed a joint Norwegian-Russian investigation. This was rejected by the Governor. Following the 1997 accident the Governor led the investigation without questions from Arktikugol—a significant shift in the relationship between the two countries.

The Government of Russia passed a new, confidential Svalbard politic on 31 December 1997. It change the policy towards a long-term presence, and proposed closing coal mining and replacing it with other industry. By the 1990s both Barentsburg and Pyramiden were running low on coal reserves. New finds in Colesbukta teased Arktikugol to plan for expansion there. This, along with Barentsburg's better port and with Arktikugol's main administration, caused the company to prefer to keep it in operations. Closure of Pyramiden was discussed at a meeting in Moscow on 28 July 1997. The plan for closing was finalized and approved by the Ministry of Energy on 23 March 1998. The last breaking of coal took place on 1 April and by the late summer the town had been shut down, and all activities moved to Barentsburg.

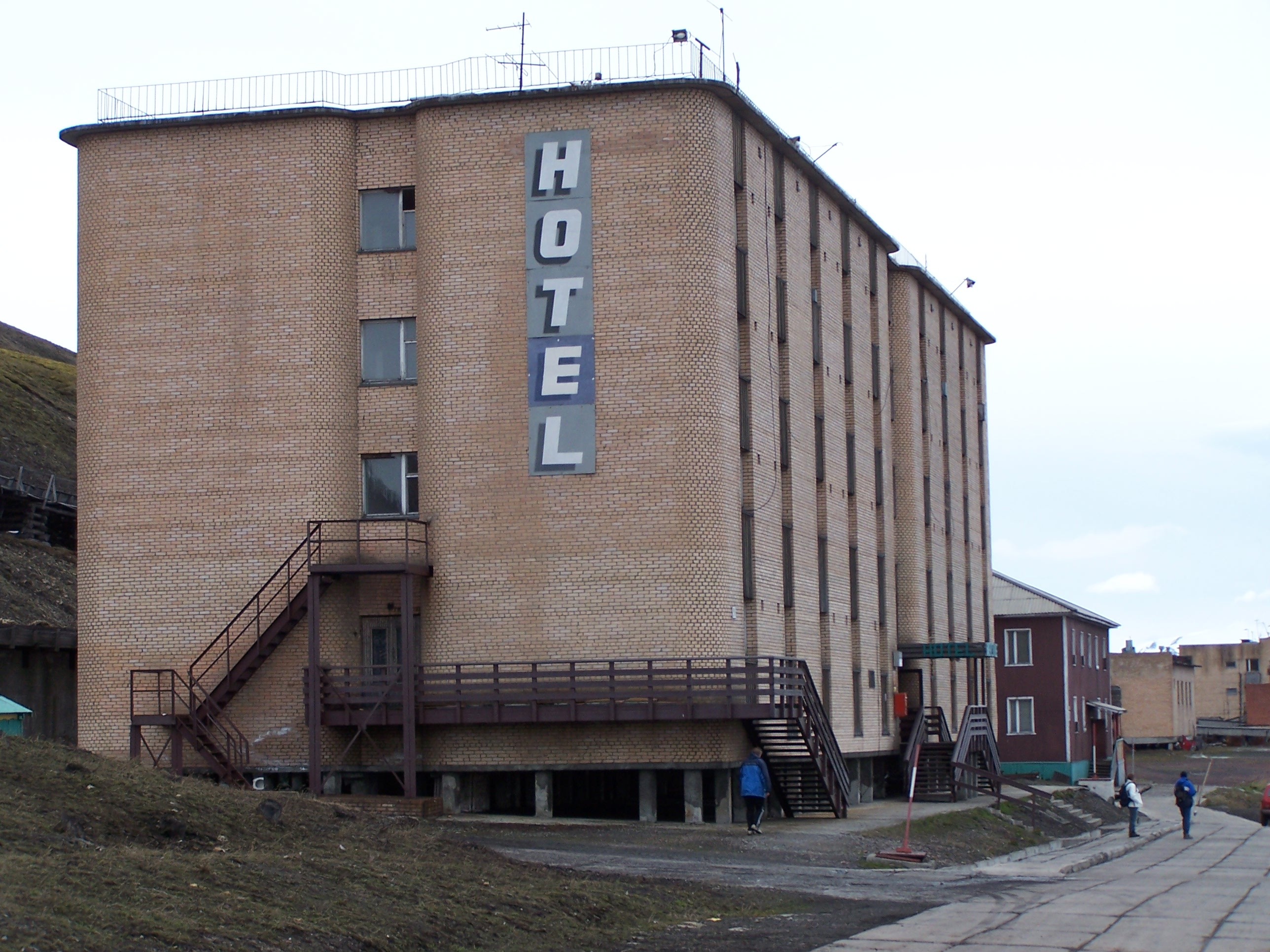
Barentsburg Hotel was built to help diversify the economy, but has failed to make money for its owner, Arktikugol

Arktikugol's head office was moved to Murmansk in 1999, but then returned to Moscow in 2004. During this period the company underwent a series of restructurings. From 2000 the government decided that all Russian activities on Svalbard will be financed through subsidies to Arktikugol. Arktikugol continued to reduce its welfare level: employees' wages were cut, free food was withdrawn and the barn closed. A group of workers went on strike, just to be sent home by the first ship. In 2004 two men in Barentsburg were apprehended for manslaughter. The rescue corps in Barentsburg had function as its police, but for the first time the Governor arrived and arrested a Russian subject in Barentsburg.

The Accounts Chamber of Russia published a report in 2005 which was highly critical of the management of Arktikugol. Large sums of money could not be accounted for, government instructions and plans had not been implemented and the Russian presence had not been managed in a suitable way, especially related to diversification. The company did not have an auditor, had an unaccounted for account in the bank in Longyearbyen and did not keep books for its tourist revenue. The infrastructure was dilapidated, the subsidies per produced tonne of coal were increasing rapidly and 17.5 percent of all man-hours were being used on resolving accidents. A delegation was dispatched in March 2006, followed by two more that year. In January 2006 a fire started in one of the seams. Proper extinction was not carried out and was estimated to be able to burn for years or even decades, halting production. At the same time the issue was straining the relationship with Norway and the Governor.

The company's management was replaced in late 2006 and the state grants were given for fire fighting equipment to quench the political embarrassment. Within six months the fire was extinguished. The new management also announced plans to invest in new infrastructure, including a shopping mall equaling that in Longyearbyen. A small group of employees were moved to Pyramiden in 2007 to keep it maintained and clean it up, including the construction of a dam to keep a river from flooding the town. A total renovation of the power station started the same year. A new management was appointed in 2008. From that year a series of safety and environment requirements investments were made, largely to comply with Norwegian standards. However, on 30 March a Mi-8 crashed at Heerodden, killing three. Two months later a fire broke out and killed three miners. Caused by faulty technical conditions, the fire was not extinguished until it had been filled with water—a process that took a year.

== Operations ==
Over its history, Arktikugol has mined more than 22 million tonnes of coal. In 2006, Arktikugol produced 120,000 tonnes of coal per year. The company has operated at a deficit since the 1990s. Observers including Øyvind Nordsletten, the former Norwegian ambassador to Russia, have theorized that the Russian government continues funding its operations in order to maintain a foothold in the Arctic, not out of an actual need for Svalbard's resources.

== Incidents ==
In 1989, five people were killed in an explosion at the Barentsburg mine. On 18 September 1997, 23 Russian and Ukrainian miners were killed in an explosion at the Barentsburg mine. This was the most serious mining accident ever on Norwegian soil. In April 2008, two people died in the fire at the Barentsburg mine.

On 17 October 2006 Norwegian inspectors detected an underground, smoldering fire in Barentsburg, prompting fears that an open fire might break out, which would have forced the evacuation of all of Barentsburg for an indefinite period of time, and also caused unknown environmental problems for the entire archipelago.

== Bibliography ==
- Bjørklund, Kristoffer Krogh (2008). Caltex-saken og norsk oljepolitikk på Svalbard 1960–1973 (in Norwegian). Oslo: University of Oslo.
- Jørgensen, Jørgen Holtet (2010). Russisk svalbardpolitikk (in Norwegian). Trondheim: Tapir Akademisk Forlag. ISBN 978-82-519-2611-9.
- Hoel, Adolf (1966). Svalbards historie 1596–1965 (in Norwegian). Vol. 1. Oslo: Sverre Kildahls Boktrykkeri.
- Thusesen, Nils Petter (2005). Svalbards historie i årstall (in Norwegian). Oslo: Orion. ISBN 82-458-0742-7.
