= Colesbukta =

Bay in Svalbard, Norway

Coordinates: 78°06′07″N 14°57′48″E

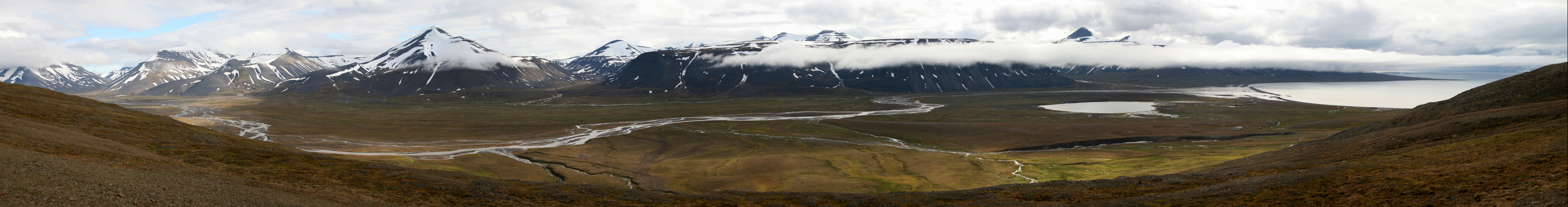
Colesdalen, with Colesbukta to the right

Colesbukta is a bay at the southern side of Isfjorden, in Nordenskiöld Land at Spitsbergen, Svalbard. The bay is about 4.5 kilometers wide. A railway for coal transport was earlier operated between Grumantbyen and shipment facilities in Colesbukta. The valley Colesdalen debouches into Colesbukta.

The cabin built by the Russian geologist Vladimir Rusanov in 1912 at the entrance to Colesbukta has been turned into a small self-guided museum. Other buildings and facilities in the old Soviet settlement remain abandoned.
