= Economy of Svalbard =

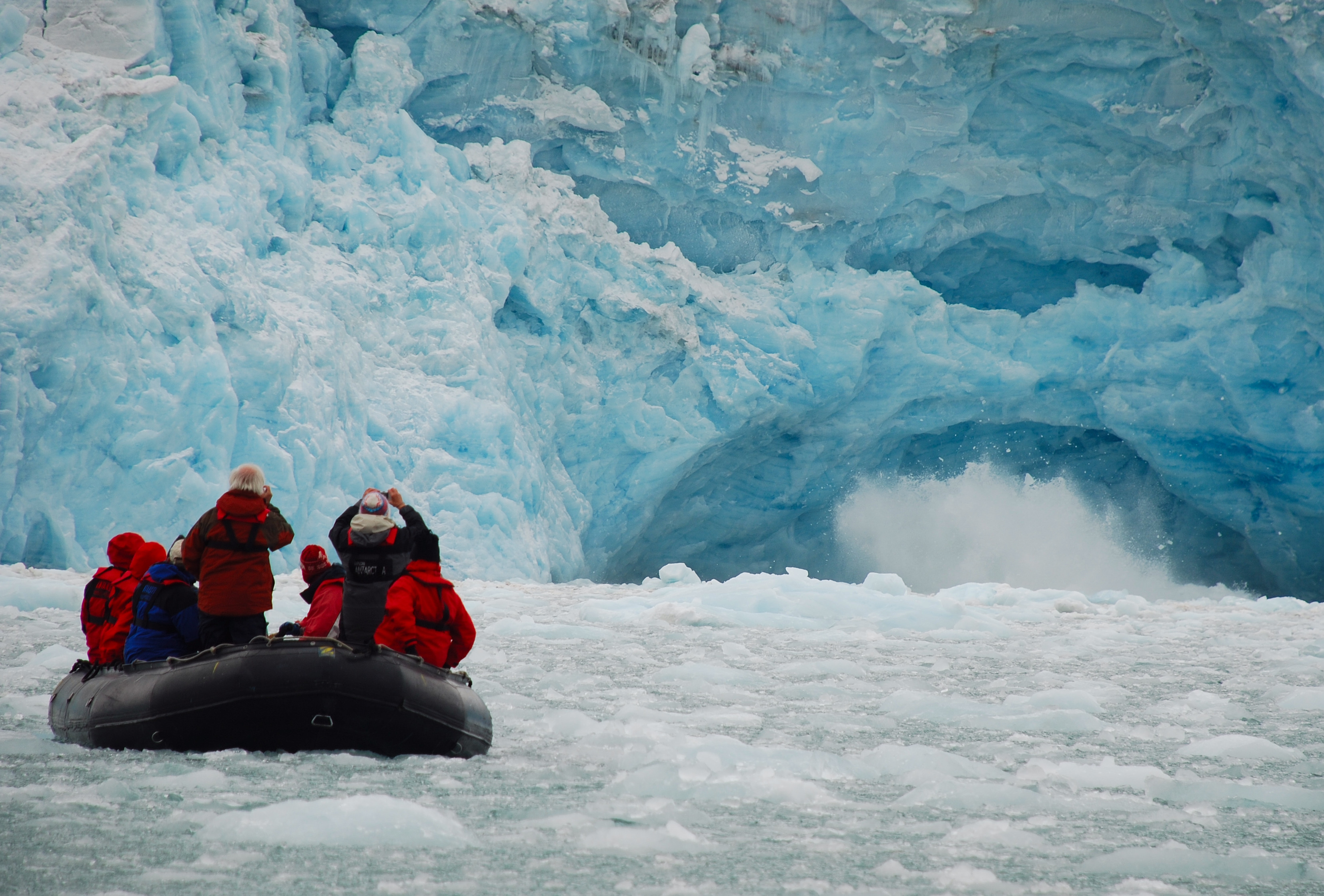
Tourism in Svalbard

The economy of Svalbard is dominated by coal mining, tourism and research. In 2007, there were 484 people working in the mining sector, 211 people working in the tourism sector and 111 people working in the education sector. The same year, mining gave a revenue of 2.008 billion kr, tourism NOK 317 million and research 142 million. In 2006, the average income for economically active people was NOK 494,700, or 23% higher than on the mainland. Almost all housing is owned by the various employers and institutions and rented to their employees; there are only a few privately owned houses, most of which are recreational cabins. Because of this, it is nearly impossible to live on Svalbard without working for an established institution. The Spitsbergen Treaty and Svalbard Act established Svalbard as an economic free zone and demilitarized zone in 1925.

== Food ==
=== Agriculture ===

Agriculture in Svalbard – the archipelago containing the world's northernmost permanently inhabited settlements – has a short history, and remains a minor economic factor, but has nonetheless had a culturally and socially significant role, as well as an ecologic impact. Svalbard is home to the Global Seed Vault, which serves to protect the world's biological and agricultural diversity. Polar Permaculture Solutions, AS was formed in January 2015. Polar Permaculture has been focused on producing locally grown food in town, and also with composting food waste.

=== Fishing and hunting ===
Svalbard has historically been a base for both whaling and fishing. Norway claimed a 200 nautical miles (370 km; 230 mi) exclusive economic zone (EEZ) around Svalbard in 1977, with 31,688 square kilometres (12,235 sq mi) of internal waters and 770,565 square kilometres (297,517 sq mi) of EEZ. Norway retains a restrictive fisheries policy in the zone, and the claims are disputed by Russia.

=== Brewing ===
Establishing a brewery on the Svalbard archipelago required a change of Norwegian law, which prohibited commercial production of alcoholic beverages there until 2014. Svalbard Bryggeri established production of several beers in Longyearbyen in 2015, after the law was changed. 16% of the water used for brewing is thawed ice from the 2,000 year old Bogerbreen glacier. The brewery claims to be the northernmost brewery in the world.

== Taxation ==
The Spitsbergen Treaty of 1920 established full Norwegian sovereignty over the archipelago. The islands are, unlike the Norwegian Antarctic territories, part of the Kingdom of Norway and not a dependency. The treaty came into effect in 1925, following the Svalbard Act. All forty signatory countries of the treaty have the right to conduct commercial activities on the archipelago without discrimination, although all activity is subject to Norwegian legislation. The treaty limits Norway's right to collect taxes to that of providing services on Svalbard. Therefore, Svalbard has a lower income tax than mainland Norway, and there is no value added tax. There is a separate budget for Svalbard to ensure compliance. Svalbard is a demilitarized zone, as the treaty prohibits the establishment of military installations. Norwegian military activity is limited to fisheries surveillance by the Norwegian Coast Guard. The treaty requires Norway to protect the natural environment.

== Mining ==
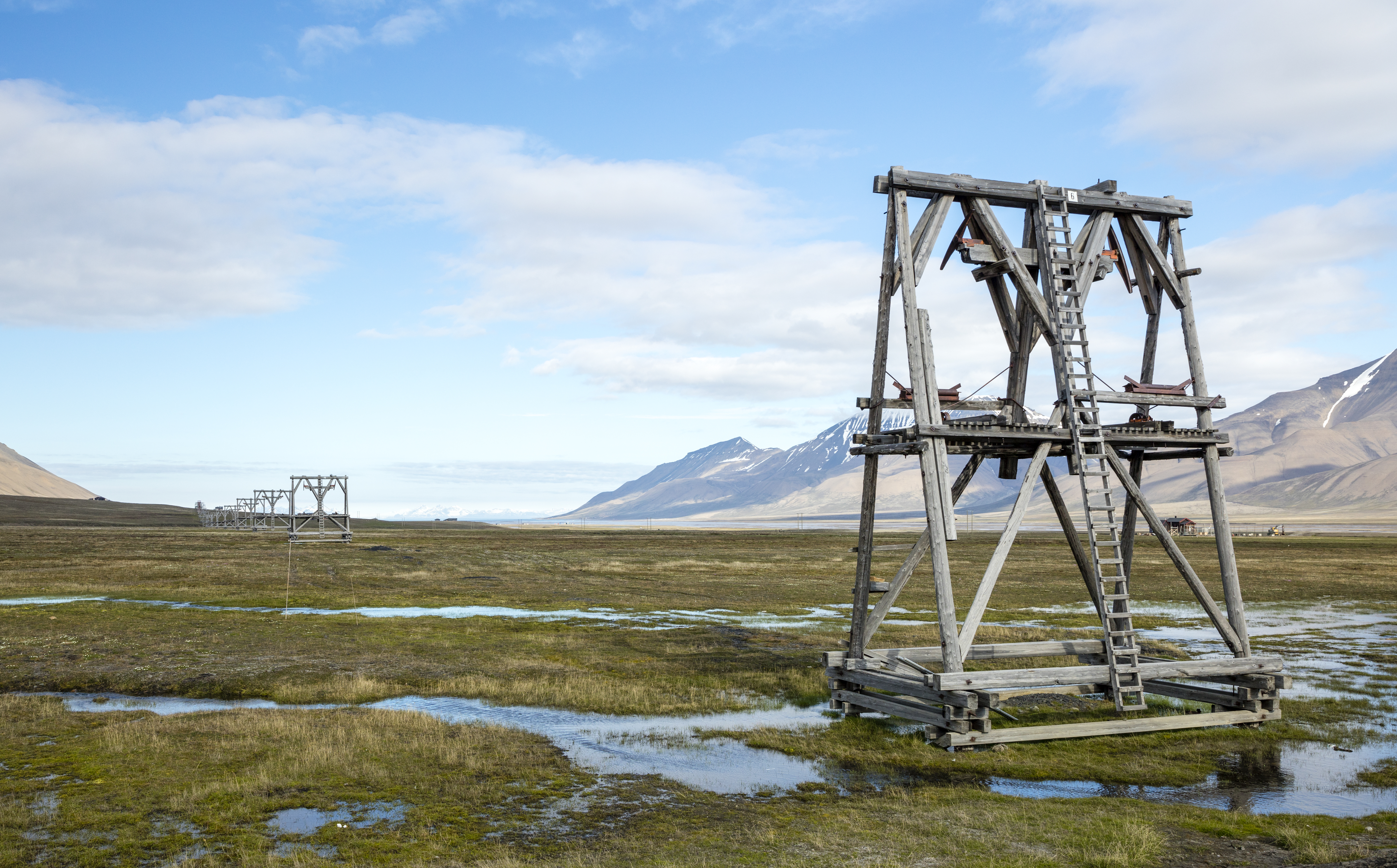
Old cable tower from Adventdalen to Longyearbyen, Svalbard

Since the resettlement of Svalbard in the early 20th century, coal mining has been the dominant commercial activity. Store Norske Spitsbergen Kulkompani, a subsidiary of the Norwegian Ministry of Trade and Industry, operates Svea Nord in Sveagruva and Mine 7 in Longyearbyen. The former produced 3.4 million tonnes in 2008, while the latter uses 35% of its output to power the power station in Longyearbyen. Since 2007, there has not been any significant mining by the Russian state-owned Arktikugol in Barentsburg. There have previously been performed test drilling for petroleum on land, but these did not give satisfactory results for permanent operation. The Norwegian authorities do not allow offshore petroleum activities for environmental reasons, and the land formerly test-drilled on has been protected as natural reserves or national parks.

== Tourism ==
Tourism is centered on Longyearbyen. Activities include hiking, kayaking, walks through glacier caves and snow-scooter and dog-sleds. Cruise ships generate a significant portion of the traffic, including both stops by offshore vessels and expeditionary cruises starting and ending in Svalbard. Traffic is strongly concentrated between March and August; overnights have quintupled (from 1991 to 2008), when there were 93,000 guest-nights.

The world's northernmost blues festival, Dark Season Blues, is an annual event in late October in Longyearbyen, and marks the beginning of the dark season when daylight and the sun is about to leave Svalbard for four long winter months.

Norway announced in February 2012 that, in order to protect the islands from the danger of a ship running aground and possibly causing an oil spill within a pristine fjord, it would implement a requirement for cruise ships to carry a licensed pilot in order for the ship to enter any of the islands' fjords. Many of the fjords on Svalbard are quite dangerous, with strong torrents and narrow fairways. The pilot requirement will be phased-in gradually. Starting in 2012, all vessels going to the Svea coal mine had to carry a pilot. Starting in 2013, all passenger vessels over 150 meters had to have a pilot when going into one of the fjords on Svalbard. And starting in 2014, all boats over 70 meters and all passenger vessels longer than 24 meters needed to have a pilot when entering one of the fjords.

A total of 72,544 guests arrived in Svalbard in 2018, up from 60,016 in 2015 and 34,752 in 2010, excluding campers. As of 2015, 66% of visitors in Svalbard were tourists, while 28% traveled to the islands for scientific and 6% for business purposes. One fourth of the population works in the tourism industry. In 2019, 46,000 tourists participated in one-day cruises to Pyramiden or Barentsburg or longer cruises around the archipelago, compared to 16,000 in 2012. The number of accommodations in Svalbard has been increasing recently due the current tourism developments, and there are currently 9 hotels, 6 wilderness cabins, 5 guest houses, 1 apartment, and 1 camping site. The geographic remoteness and harsh climate of the Norwegian archipelago is also increasingly attracting visitors.

== Research ==
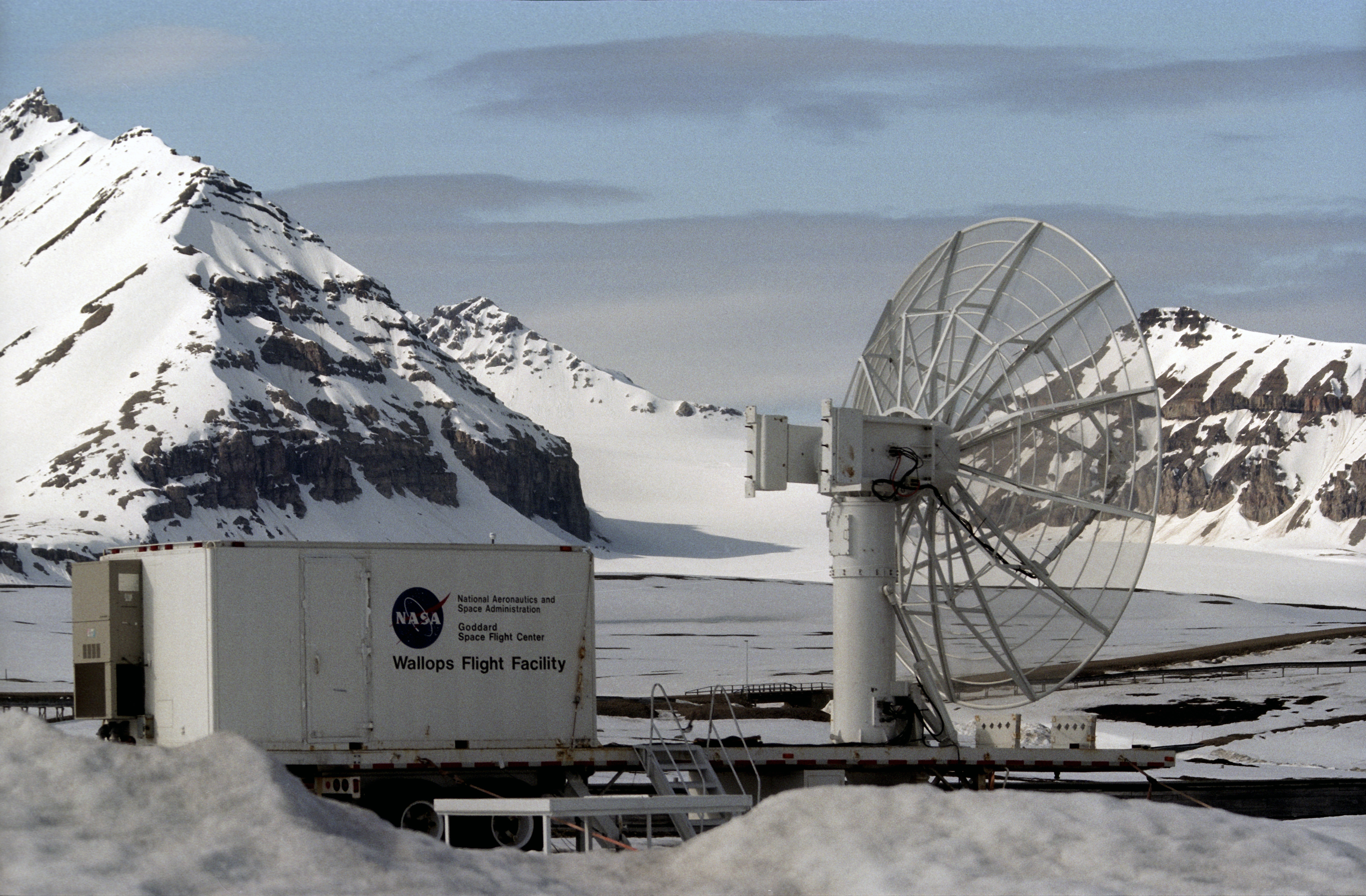
NASA research facility in Ny-Ålesund

Research on Svalbard centers on Longyearbyen and Ny-Ålesund, the most accessible areas in the high Arctic. Norway grants permission for any nation to conduct research on Svalbard, resulting in the Polish Polar Station and the Chinese Arctic Yellow River Station. The University Centre in Svalbard (UNIS) in Longyearbyen was established in 1993 and offers undergraduate, graduate and postgraduate courses to 350 students. The Svalbard Global Seed Vault is a "doomsday" seedbank to store seeds from as many of the world's crop varieties and their botanical wild relatives as possible. A cooperation between the Government of Norway and the Global Crop Diversity Trust, the vault is cut into rock near Longyearbyen, keeping it at a natural −6 °C (21 °F) and refrigerating the seeds to −18 °C (0 °F). The Svalbard Undersea Cable System is a 1,440 km (890 mi) fibre optic lines from Svalbard to Harstad, needed for communicating with polar orbiting satellite stations on Svalbard.

== Transport ==
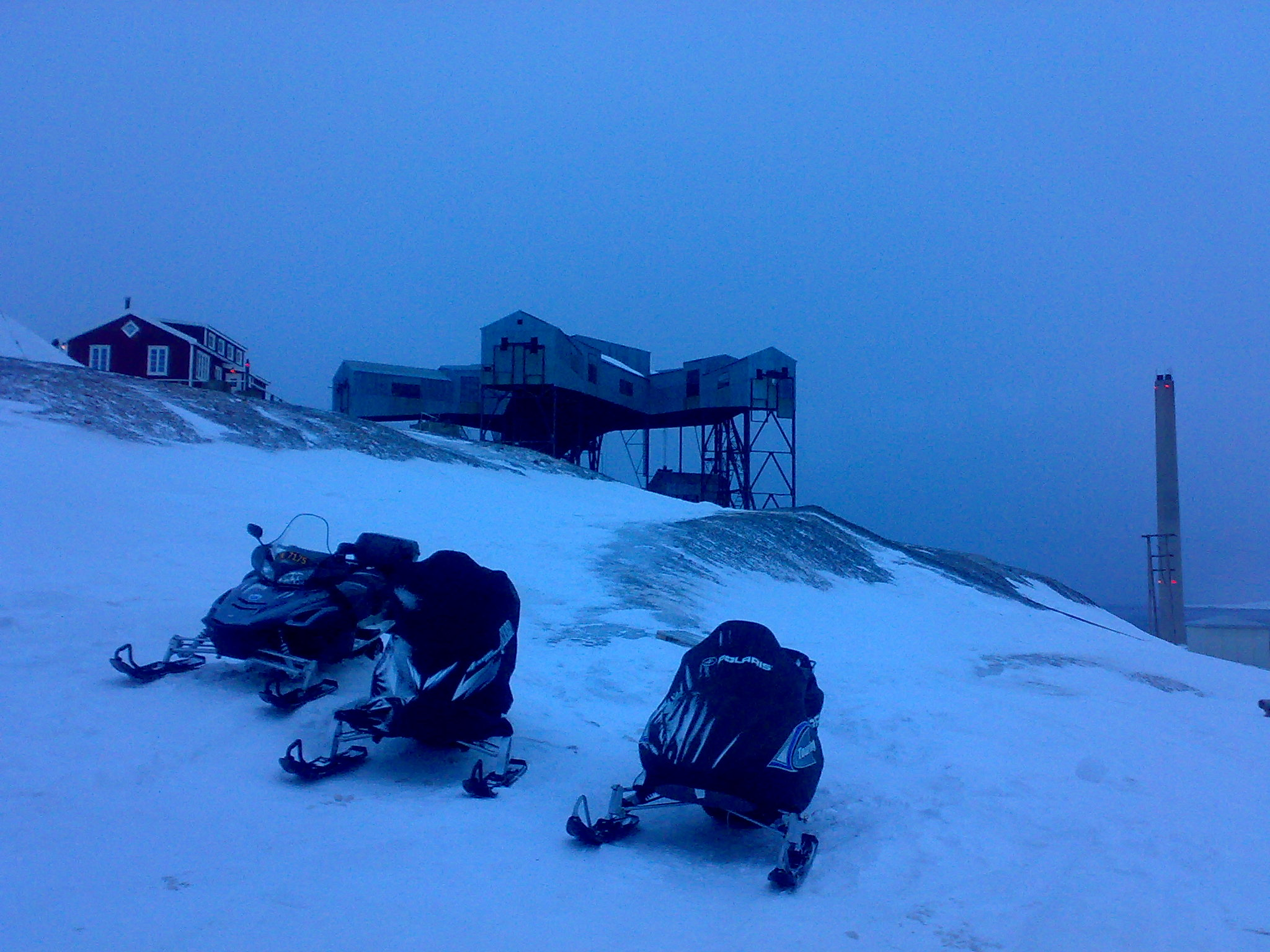
Snowmobiles at Longyearbyen

Within Longyearbyen there is a road system, but it does not connect with any other settlements. The town does have a bus system. Off-road motorized transport is prohibited on bare ground, but snowmobiles are used extensively during winter—both for commercial and recreational activities. Transport from Longyearbyen to Barentsburg (45 km or 28 mi) and Pyramiden (100 km or 62 mi) is possible by snowmobile in winter, or by ship all year round.

Svalbard Airport, Longyear, located 3 kilometres (2 mi) from Longyearbyen, is the only airport offering air transport off the archipelago. Scandinavian Airlines has daily scheduled services to Tromsø and Oslo; there are also irregular charter services to Russia. Lufttransport provides regular corporate charter services from Longyearbyen to Ny-Ålesund Airport, Hamnerabben and Svea Airport for Kings Bay and Store Norske. There are heliports in Barentsburg and Pyramiden, and helicopters are frequently used by the governor and to a lesser extent Arktikugol.
