= Kapp Lee =

Headland of Edgeøya, Svalbard

Coordinates: 78.1149°N 20.8282°E

Kapp Lee is a headland of Edgeøya, Svalbard. It is the northwestern point of the island, and is located north of Dolerittneset. South of Kapp Lee, and north of Dolerittneset, is a suitable harbour site for vessels.
