= Archaeology of Svalbard =

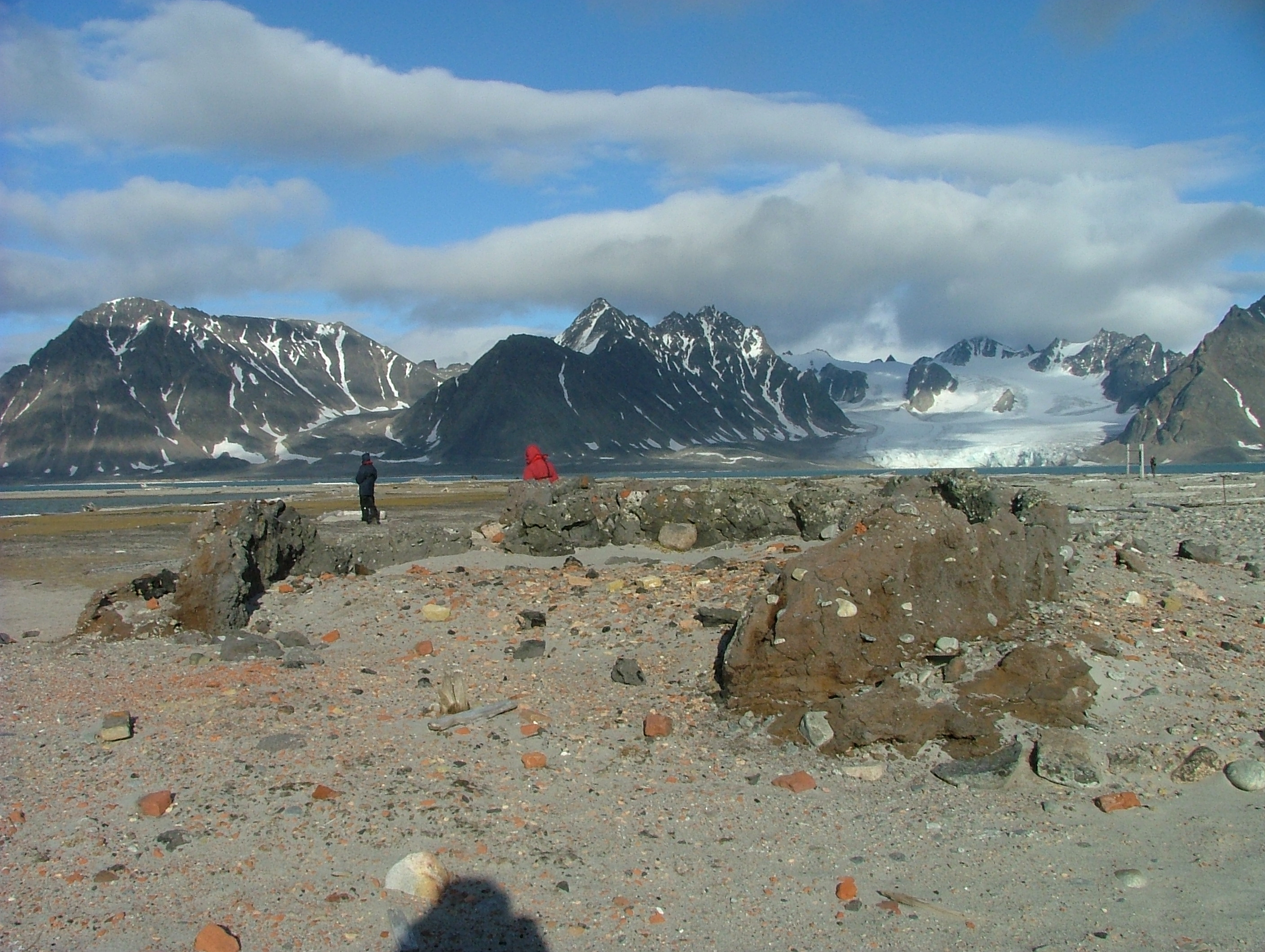
The remains of ovens used to boil whale blubber in Smeerenburg, a 17th-century Dutch whaling station on Amsterdam Island.

The archaeology of Svalbard is the study of human activity in the northerly Arctic Ocean archipelago's past. The geography, environment and climate of Svalbard have resulted in exceptional preservation conditions. (But rapid climate change – with a now warmer and more humid environment – is causing damage.) Archaeological fieldwork on Svalbard is both expensive and physically exhausting, but new technology and infrastructure has allowed easier access. This easier access has also resulted in more damage caused by tourists.

Rather than being managed by the Norwegian Directorate for Cultural Heritage as standard in most of Norway, the Governor of Svalbard is responsible for all historical sites and all archaeological work on Svalbard, much as the Sami Parliament is responsible for managing Sami-related cultural heritage. All cultural heritage sites or objects originating from 1946 or before are automatically protected by law, a rule applying to all types of remains.

== History ==
=== Early history ===
The scientific field of archaeology has a relatively long history in Svalbard, beginning as early as 1861. At the time, Svalbard was legally terra nullius, historically claimed by many countries but controlled by none. A decade before the first attempt at a permanent settlement in the archipelago, amateur research was carried out by many of the natural scientists exploring the region at the time. This first period of archaeological activity on Svalbard lasted until about 1913, before most scientific expeditions were halted by World War I. Between 1861 and 1913, people like the geologist Gerard De Geer mainly investigated the 18th century hunting camps of the Pomors, with for example the physicist Vilhelm Carlheim-Gyllensköld studying graves at the Dutch 17th century whaling station Virgohamna during the Swedish-Russian Arc-of-Meridian Expedition. Due to the methods used in surveying these sites, the results have little scientific value today.

Following the First World War's end, the Svalbard Treaty was signed. Through this agreement Norway was established as the ruling power of Svalbard, although full rights were granted to other nationalities to engage in (among other fields, such as economic activity) scientific research. Between 1933 and 1935, Helge Ingstad – later well known for discovering L'Anse aux Meadows – served as the region's Governor. Little research would take place in Svalbard until well after World War II – it wasn't until 1955 that a second period of active archaeology began, the first professional such – although amateur work continued as well. It was initiated by a joint Scandinavian expedition, led by Hans Christiansson and Povl Simonsen, who set out to search for evidence of Stone Age activity, as well as to investigate a Russian historical site, Russekeila.

It was at this time that a dispute began about whether the archaeological evidence could prove who discovered Svalbard – while some have said it was the Norse people during the Viking Age, most scholars agree it was Willem Barentsz in 1596. Christiansson believed that the findings made from 1955 and onwards proved that Svalbard had been inhabited during the Stone Age period, viewing them as evidence of early stone tool use. The German archaeologist H .W. Hansen would later add to this hypothesis, finding more supposed artefacts. Most modern scientists reject this theory. In 1958 a Norwegian-Finnish expedition led by Helmer Tegengren explored another Russian site at Trygghamna. A decade later, in 1968, A. Dalland conducted an amateur excavation of a Russian station on Kapp Lee, Edgeøya, and the same year Svein Molaug excavated a blubber oven and made an underwater survey at Sorgfjorden. This was the first known use of maritime archaeology on Svalbard.

=== Later history ===
A third period began in 1978, and has lasted until the present day. Preceded by an article written by the Norwegian-Russian palaeontologist Anatol Heintz in 1964, a Soviet expedition from the Institute of Archaeology at the USSR Academy of Sciences – led by Vadim F. Starkov – set out to prove that the Russian Pomors had preceded the Dutch on Svalbard. The Soviet Union had strong commercial and diplomatic interests in Svalbard at the time, among other things running two significant mining towns – Barentsburg and Pyramiden. The site excavated by the Soviet archaeologists, "Russekeila 2", and several others like it were used to back this hypothesis. The expedition also continued research into later Russian hunting activities as well.

In 1979, a large project to investigate Dutch whaling history in Svalbard was started, led by Louwrens Hacquebord. During the 1979-81 seasons the expedition excavated Smeerenburg, a significant settlement run by whalers. While the old myths of Smeerenburg's grandeur were largely disproven, the project did result in many valuable 17th century finds, and new knowledge of the region.

The 1980s were a hectic period in archaeology on Svalbard. In 1980, a Polish People's Republic expedition from Jagiellonian University in Kraków started research in Hornsund, near the Polish polar research station, excavating whaling stations and Russian hunting camps. In 1984, a Danish-Norwegian expedition led by Svend E. Albrethsen excavated the graves of whalers on Danes Island and an expedition from the University of Tromsø directed by Roger Jorgensen carried out an act of rescue archaeology, excavating an old Russian house in Gipsvika. University of Tromsø would go on to carry out annual excavations from then on, including a 1987-1990 research project on Russian hunting stations, carried out jointly with the Polish scientists from Jagiellonian University, surveying and excavating several sites. In 1991, following the dissolution of the Soviet Union, Vadim F. Starkov returned to carry out an expedition under the joint leadership of him, the Polish Kazimierz Pękala, and the Polish-Norwegian Marek E. Jasiński.

=== Modern period ===
Since the 1990s, many archaeological projects have been carried out, some of them refocusing from the old 17th and 18th century structures towards contemporary archaeology. There are many remains from the intense coal mining that has been going on since the late 19th century, with many mines abandoned, and the Svalbard landscape often strewn with leftover equipment and abandoned infrastructure from this industry. This industrial heritage, in for example Longyearbyen and Ny-Ålesund, has become more and more prominently featured in telling the story of Svalbard. Historical remains previously ignored have now been surveyed and registered, for example in 2012.

Another example of this is Pyramiden, a Soviet (later Russian) mining town which has been abandoned for almost two decades, hosting only a minor tourism-related staff. In 2010 the Norwegian archaeologist Bjørnar Olsen co-authored Persistent memories: Pyramiden – a Soviet mining town in the High Arctic, and several others have taken a scientific interest in this site. Also during the 1990s and the early 21st century, P. J. Capelloti and others have worked with rediscovering the history of the numerous airship expeditions made to Svalbard during the late 1800s and early 1900s.

Several museums on Svalbard document its history, and showcase archaeological finds. Among them are the Svalbard Museum and Spitsbergen Airship Museum in Longyearbyen, and two minor Russian-run museums in Barentsburg and Pyramiden.

== See also ==
- Archaeology of Russia
- History of archaeology
- History of Svalbard
