= Svalbard Museum =

Historical and natural history museum in Longyearbyen

Coordinates: 78.222359°N 15.652997°E

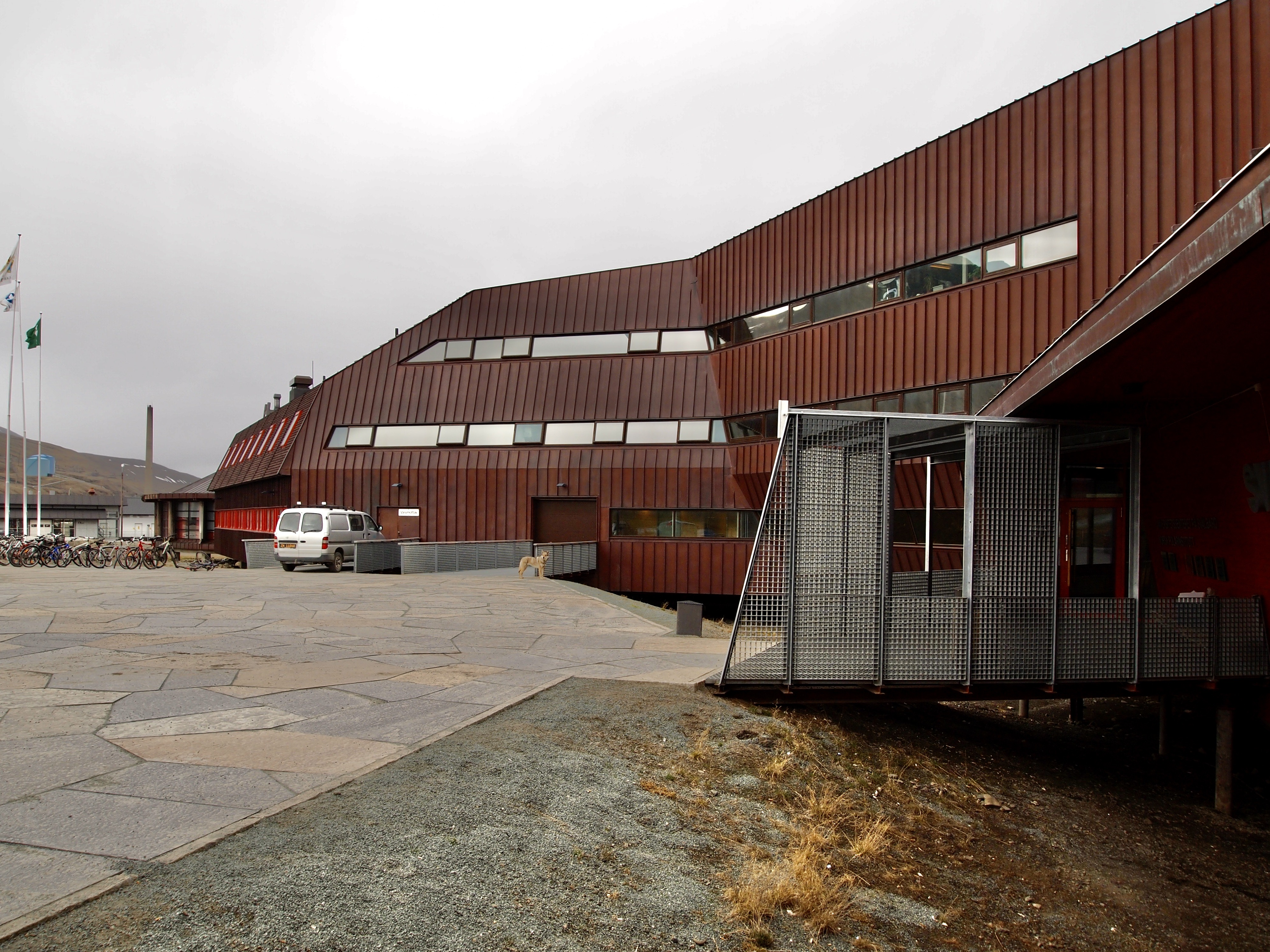
Svalbard Museum exterior

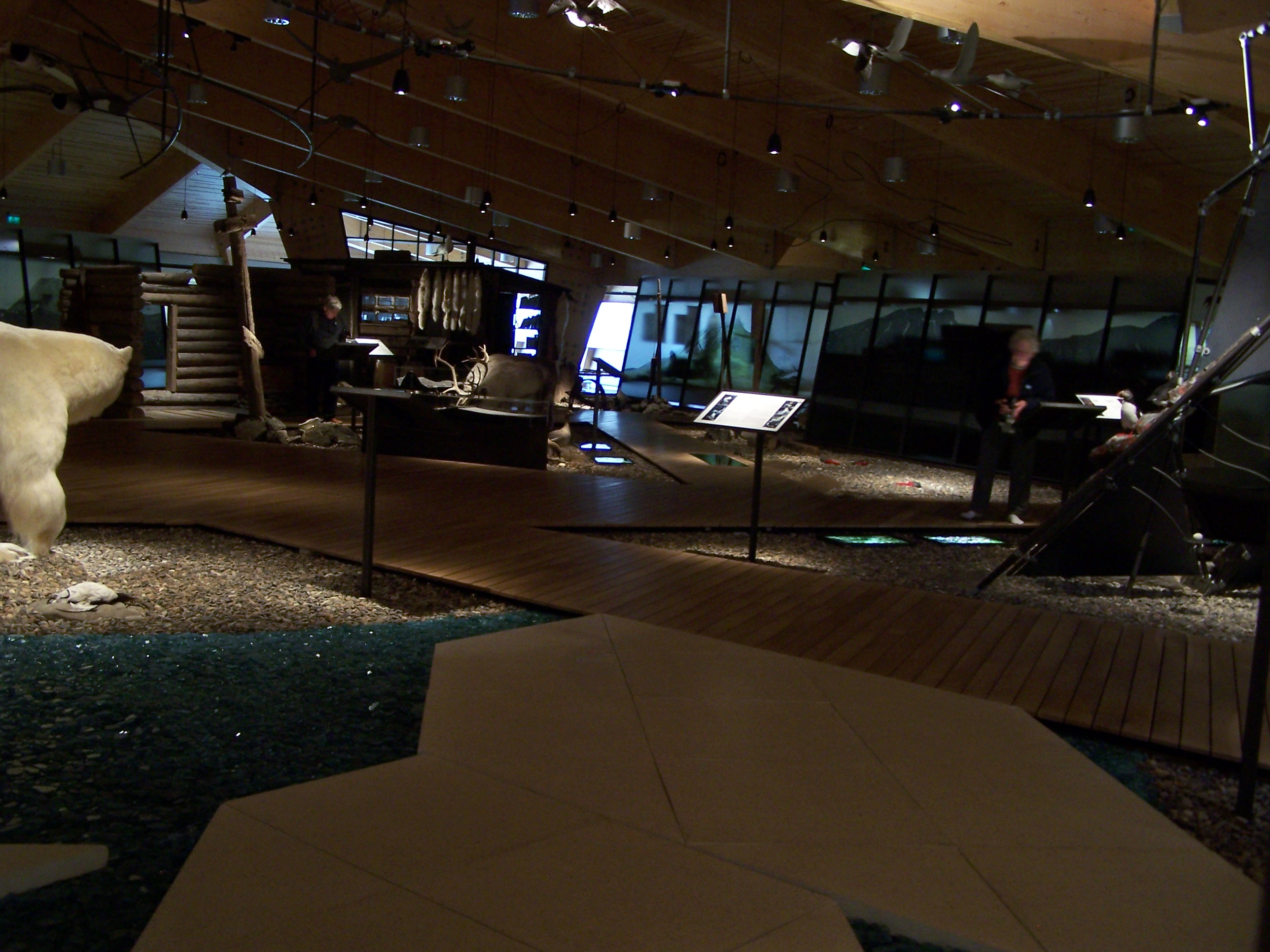
Svalbard Museum interior

The Svalbard Museum is a museum in Longyearbyen, the largest town in the Svalbard archipelago. The museum displays artifacts from the history of Svalbard since its settlement, and exhibits of local plants and animals. Its exhibitions describe the factors that support human activity in Svalbard, showing the close relationship between nature and human cultural history on the islands. "Life in Light and Ice" is the museum's core exhibit. It describes the history of the archipelago, from the first whalers to the present society based on mining, research, and tourism.

Managing collections and engaging in research and dissemination within the broad and complex fields the Svalbard Museum's mission means that they must collaborate with local, regional, national, and international entities. They're always on the lookout for potentially fruitful collaborative projects.

The museum is housed in the University Centre in Svalbard building.

The Svalbard Museum was awarded the 2008 Council of Europe Museum Prize, awarded annually by the Committee on Culture, Science and Education of the Parliamentary Assembly of the Council of Europe (under the European Museum of the Year Award scheme of the European Museum Forum). The award is given annually to a European museum which (among other criteria) is judged to have made a significant contribution to the understanding of European cultural heritage.

== History ==
The first Svalbard Museum wasn't what we would consider a typical one by today's modern standards. Longyearbyen, 1964 the museum's first committee was formed, from there more artifact were collected, and in 1969, 86 artifacts remained in the old post office below the church.

18 January 1979 the first board of directors was established.

1981, the museum welcomed the public into its premises in the old pig barn for the first time, and the venue was officially opened 20 February 1982. For many years the museum relied solely on the active participation of volunteers from the local community, and up until 1998, it had no employees.

1999, work began to ‘professionalise’ the museum, again in close cooperation with the local community. The museum was organised as a subsidiary entity under the local Svalbard Council, was converted to a foundation in 2000, and from 2002 became a separate department under the newly established Longyearbyen Community Council.

2006, the museum moved into the newly built Svalbard Science Centre

The Centre houses exhibitions, storerooms, laboratories, and offices, the building is approx. 1500 square metres. The museum's operations are funded in part by the Ministry of Justice and Public Security and the Ministry of Culture and Equality. With a cultural history depository and laboratories containing 55,000 artifacts, and have a digital photo archive that currently comprises over 27,000 images (collections).

As of February 2023, Svalbard Museum has twelve employees.

In 1998, Svalbard Museum welcomed about 14 000 visitors; in 2022, about 45 000. This formidable increase demonstrates the museum's relevance, along with the domestic and international focus on Svalbard, the High North, and the Arctic.
