= Grumant =

Grumant Грумант
- Ghost town
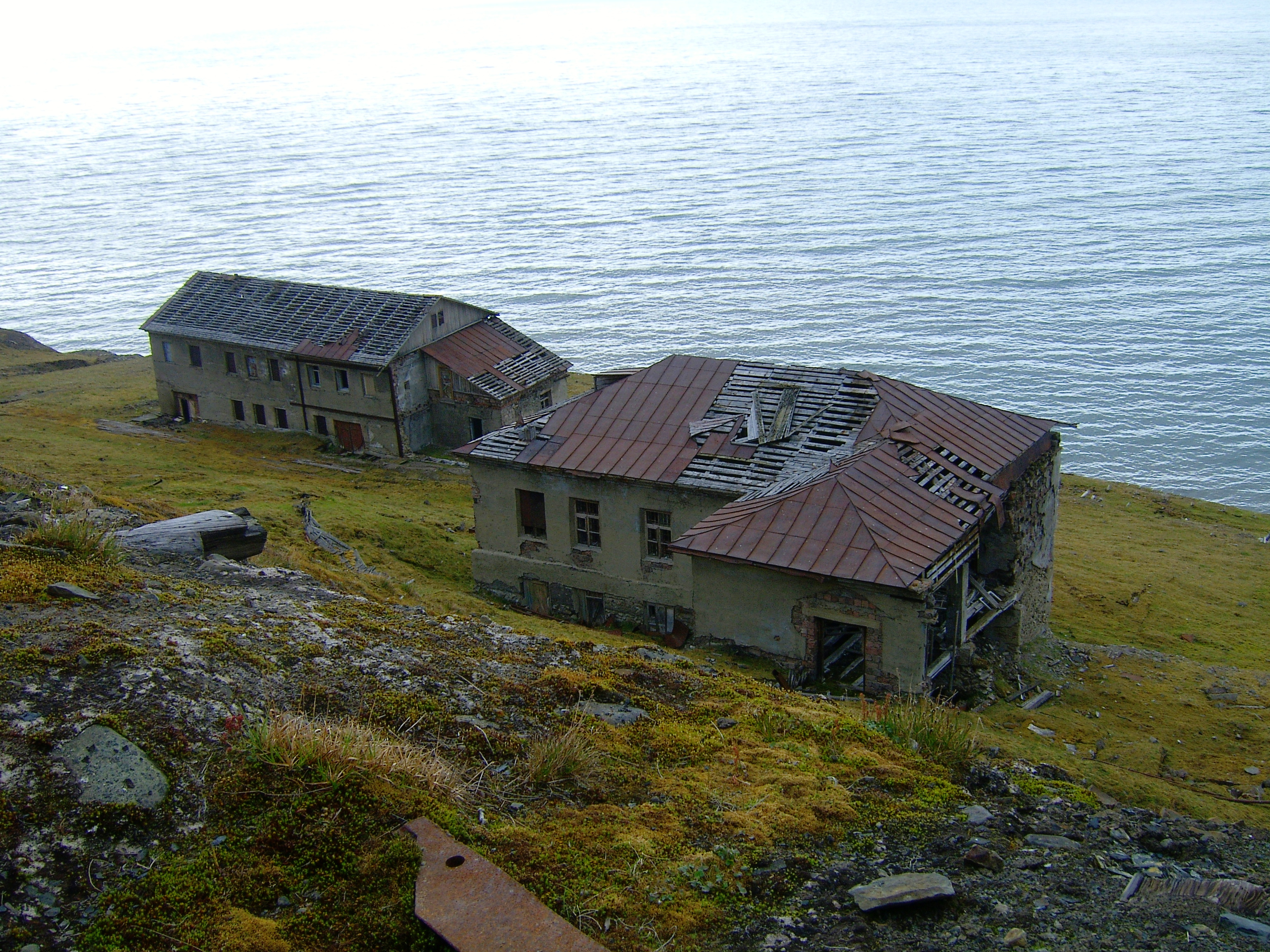
- Settlement ruins (2007)

- Location in western Svalbard
- Coordinates: 78°10′40″N 15°06′45″E
- Country: Norway
- Syssel: Svalbard
- island: Spitsbergen

Population (1961)
  - Total: 0
- Time zone: UTC+2 (CET)
  - Summer (DST): +3

Grumant (Russian: Грумант) is a former Soviet company town in Svalbard, Norway, established in 1912 and abandoned in 1965. The population—including Coles Bay, which served the settlement's port—peaked at 1,106 in 1951. The name Grumant is of Pomory origin, and is also used to refer to the whole of the Svalbard archipelago. It may be a corruption of Greenland, with which the land was confused.

Grumant is located on Spitsbergen, the largest of the Svalbard archipelago's islands, about 10 kilometres (6.2 mi) west-southwest of Longyearbyen, the administrative centre.
