= Svalbard Treaty =

Treaty recognising Norwegian sovereignty over Svalbard

Treaty recognising the sovereignty of Norway over the Archipelago of Spitsbergen, including Bear Island Traité reconnaissant la souveraineté de la Norvège sur l'archipel du Spitsberg, y compris l'île aux Ours
- Ratifications of the treaty
- Signed: 9 February 1920
- Location: Paris, France
- Effective: 14 August 1925
- Condition: Ratification by all the signatory powers
- Parties: 49 – see list
- Depositary: Government of the French Republic
- Languages: French and English

Full text
- Spitsbergen Treaty at Wikisource

The Svalbard Treaty (originally the Spitsbergen Treaty) recognises the sovereignty of Norway over the Arctic archipelago of Svalbard, at the time called Spitsbergen. The exercise of sovereignty is, however, subject to certain stipulations, and not all Norwegian law applies. The treaty restricts military uses of the archipelago, but it is not demilitarized. The signatories were given equal rights to engage in commercial activities (mainly coal mining) on the islands. Norway and Russia have exercised this right.

Uniquely, the archipelago is an entirely visa-free zone under the terms of the Svalbard Treaty.

The treaty was signed on 9 February 1920 and submitted for registration in the League of Nations Treaty Series on 21 October 1920. There were 14 original High Contracting Parties: Denmark, France, Italy, Japan, the Netherlands, Norway, Sweden, the United Kingdom (including Australia, Canada, New Zealand, South Africa, and India), and the United States. Of the original signatories, Japan was the last to ratify the treaty, on 2 April 1925, and the treaty came into force on 14 August 1925.

Many additional nations acceded to the treaty after it was ratified by the original signatories, including several before it came into force. As of 2026, there are 49 parties to the treaty.

== Name of the treaty ==
The original treaty is titled the Treaty recognising the sovereignty of Norway over the Archipelago of Spitsbergen. It refers to the entire archipelago as Spitsbergen, which had been the only name in common usage since 1596 (with minor variations in spelling). In 1925, five years after the conclusion of the treaty, the Norwegian authorities officially renamed the islands "Svalbard". This new name was a modern adaptation of the ancient toponym Svalbarði, attested in the Norse sagas as early as 1194. The exonym Spitsbergen subsequently came to be applied to the main island in the archipelago. Accordingly, in modern historiography the Treaty of Spitsbergen is commonly referred to anachronistically as the Svalbard Treaty to reflect the name change.

== History ==
The archipelago was discovered by the Dutch explorer Willem Barentsz in 1596. It was named Spitsbergen, meaning 'sharp-peaked mountains' (literally 'spits-berg'). It was uninhabited. The islands were renamed in the 1920s by Norway as Svalbard.

Spitsbergen/Svalbard began as a territory free of a nation, with people from different countries participating in industries including fishing, whaling, mining, research and later, tourism. Not belonging to any nation left Svalbard largely free of regulations or laws, though there were conflicts over the area due to whaling rights and sovereignty disputes between England, the Netherlands and Denmark–Norway in the first half of the 17th century. By the 20th century mineral deposits were found on the main island and continual conflicts between miners and owners created the need for a government.

== Contents ==
The Spitsbergen Treaty was signed in Paris on 9 February 1920, during the Versailles negotiations after World War I. In this treaty, international diplomacy recognized Norwegian sovereignty (the Norwegian administration went in effect by 1925) and other principles relating to Svalbard. This includes:

- Svalbard is part of Norway: Svalbard is completely controlled by and forms part of the Kingdom of Norway. However, Norway's power over Svalbard is restricted by the limitations listed below:
- Taxation: Taxes are allowed to be collected, but only enough to support Svalbard and the Svalbard government. This results in lower taxes than mainland Norway and the exclusion of any taxes on Svalbard supporting mainland Norway directly. Svalbard's revenues and expenses are separately budgeted from mainland Norway.
- Environmental conservation: Norway must respect and preserve the Svalbard environment.
- Non-discrimination: All citizens and all companies of every nation under the treaty are allowed to become residents and to have access to Svalbard including the right to fish, hunt or undertake any kind of maritime, industrial, mining or trade activity. The residents of Svalbard must follow Norwegian law, though Norwegian authority cannot discriminate against or favour any residents of any given nationality. Russia has exercised this right of residency and in 2022 announced new investment plans to support its presence at Barentsburg and Pyramiden.
- Military restrictions: Article 9 prohibits naval bases and fortifications and also the use of Svalbard for war-like purposes. Norway interprets this provision as still permitting access to the territory by the Norwegian Armed Forces to exercise sovereignty and protect the environment. This largely encompasses visits by Norwegian military forces, particularly Norwegian Coast Guard vessels, to the territory. However, certain other signatory states, particularly Russia, dispute this interpretation. Notably, while Norway maintains that it has exclusive rights under the United Nations Convention on the Law of the Sea to the continental shelf around Svalbard, Russia rejects this position. Russia also objects to Norwegian or NATO military activities around Svalbard which, Russia claims, undermine the treaty’s military restrictions.

== Disputes regarding natural resources ==
There has been a long-running dispute, primarily between Norway and Russia (and before it, the Soviet Union) over fishing rights in the region. In 1977, Norway established a regulated fishery in a 200 nautical miles (370 km) zone around Svalbard (though it did not close the zone to foreign access). Norway argues that the treaty's provisions of equal economic access apply only to the islands and their territorial waters (four nautical miles at the time) but not to the wider exclusive economic zone. In addition, it argues that the continental shelf is a part of mainland Norway's continental shelf and should be governed by the 1958 Continental Shelf Convention. The Soviet Union/Russia disputed and continues to dispute this position and consider the Spitsbergen Treaty to apply to the entire zone. Talks were held in 1978 in Moscow but did not resolve the issue. Finland and Canada support Norway's position, while most of the other treaty signatories have expressed no official position. The relevant parts of the treaty are as follows:

Ships and nationals of all the High Contracting Parties shall enjoy equally the rights of fishing and hunting in the territories specified in Article 1 and in their territorial waters. [Article 2]

...

They shall be admitted under the same conditions of equality to the exercise and practice of all maritime, industrial, mining or commercial enterprises both on land and in the territorial waters, and no monopoly shall be established on any account or for any enterprise whatever. [Article 3]

According to Norway's largest newspaper, Aftenposten, "Mainly the dispute is about whether the Svalbard Treaty also is in effect outside the 12 nautical mile territorial sea". The paper reported in 2011 that if the treaty comes into effect outside the zone, then Norway will not be able to claim the full 78% of profits of oil and gas harvesting.

== Parties ==
A list of parties is shown below; the dates below reflect when a nation deposited its instrument of ratification or accession. Some parties are successor states to the countries that joined the treaty, as noted below.

Country	Date of ratification or accession	Notes
Afghanistan	23 November 1929	
Albania	29 April 1930	
Argentina	6 May 1927	
Australia	29 December 1923	Extension by the United Kingdom.
Austria	12 March 1930	
Belgium	27 May 1925	
Bulgaria	20 October 1925	
Canada	29 December 1923	Extension by the United Kingdom.
Chile	17 December 1928	
China	1 July 1925	Acceded as the Republic of China. Both the People's Republic of China and the Republic of China claim to be the successor or continuing state, but as of 2026 all other parties to the treaty recognize only the People's Republic of China.
Czech Republic	21 June 2006	Czechoslovakia acceded to the treaty on 9 July 1930. On 21 June 2006, the Czech Republic stated that it considered itself bound to the treaty since its independence on 1 January 1993, as a successor state.
Denmark	24 January 1924	Extension to the entire Danish Realm.
Dominican Republic	3 February 1927	
Egypt	13 September 1925	
Estonia	7 April 1930	
Finland	12 August 1925	
France	6 September 1924	
Germany	16 November 1925	Acceded as the Weimar Republic. On 21 October 1974, East Germany stated that it also reapplied the treaty since 7 August 1974. East Germany reunited with West Germany on 3 October 1990.
Greece	21 October 1925	
Hungary	29 October 1927	
Iceland	31 May 1994	
India	29 December 1923	Extension by the United Kingdom.
Ireland	29 December 1923	The Irish Free State left the United Kingdom after the latter signed the treaty but before it was ratified. On 15 April 1976, Ireland stated that it also applied the treaty since its ratification by the United Kingdom.
Italy	6 August 1924	
Japan	2 April 1925	
Latvia	13 June 2016	
Lithuania	22 January 2013	
Monaco	22 June 1925	
Netherlands	3 September 1920	Extension to the entire Kingdom of the Netherlands.
New Zealand	29 December 1923	Extension by the United Kingdom.
North Korea	16 March 2016	
Norway	8 October 1924	
Poland	2 September 1931	
Portugal	24 October 1927	
Romania	10 July 1925	
Russia	7 May 1935	Acceded as the Soviet Union. On 27 January 1992, Russia declared that it continued to apply the treaties concluded by the Soviet Union.
Saudi Arabia	2 September 1925	Acceded as the Kingdom of Hejaz.
Serbia	5 September 2022	Yugoslavia acceded to the treaty on 6 July 1925. On 5 September 2022, Serbia declared to continue the application of the treaty.
Slovakia	21 February 2017	Czechoslovakia acceded to the treaty on 9 July 1930. On 21 February 2017, Slovakia stated that it considered itself bound to the treaty since its independence on 1 January 1993, as a successor state.
South Africa	29 December 1923	Extension by the United Kingdom.
South Korea	11 September 2012	
Spain	12 November 1925	
Sweden	15 September 1924	
Switzerland	30 June 1925	
Turkey	11 April 2024	
United Arab Emirates	23 January 2026	
United Kingdom	29 December 1923	Extension to Australia, Canada, India, New Zealand and South Africa. Ireland also applied the treaty since its ratification by the United Kingdom.
United States	2 April 1924	
Venezuela	8 February 1928	

== See also ==
- List of treaties
- Antarctic Treaty System
