= Outline of Svalbard =

Overview of and topical guide to Svalbard

The flag of Norway

The coat of arms of Norway

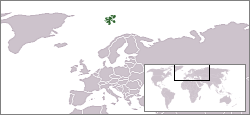
The location of Svalbard

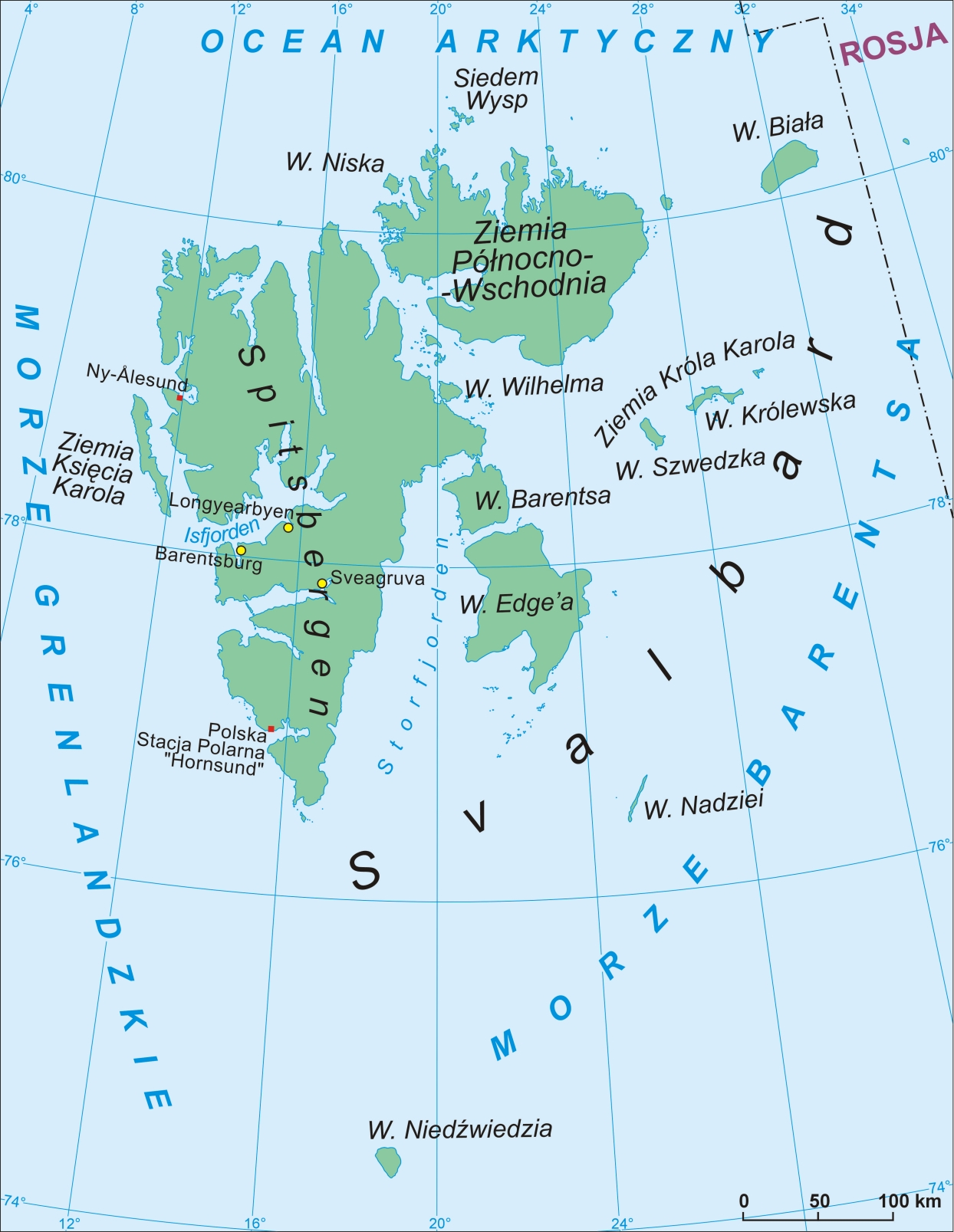
An enlargeable map of Svalbard

The following outline is provided as an overview of and topical guide to Svalbard:

Svalbard – incorporated territory of the Kingdom of Norway comprising the Svalbard Archipelago in the Arctic Ocean about midway between mainland Norway and the North Pole. The archipelago extends from 74° to 81° North, and from 10° to 35° East. The archipelago is the northernmost part of Norway. Three islands are populated: Spitsbergen, Bear Island and Hopen. The capital and largest settlement is Longyearbyen on Spitsbergen. The Spitsbergen Treaty recognises Norwegian sovereignty over Svalbard and the 1925 Svalbard Act makes Svalbard a full part of the Norwegian Kingdom.

== General reference ==
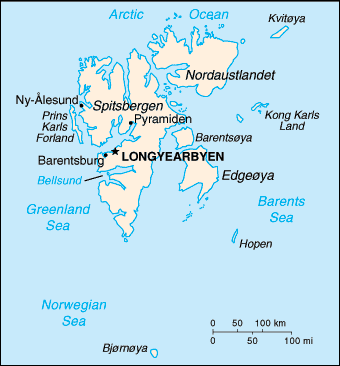
An enlargeable basic map of Svalbard

- Pronunciation: English: /ˈsvɑːlbɑːr/ SVAHL-bar, Urban East Norwegian: [ˈsvɑ̂ːɫbɑr]
- Common English country name: Svalbard
- Official English country name: Svalbard of the Kingdom of Norway
- Common endonym(s):
- Official endonym(s):
- Adjectival(s):
- Demonym(s):
- Etymology: Name of Svalbard
- ISO country codes for Svalbard and Jan Mayen: SJ, SJM, 744
- ISO region codes for Svalbard and Jan Mayen: See ISO 3166-2:SJ
- Internet country code top-level domain for Norway: .no

== Geography of Svalbard ==
An enlargeable topographic map of Svalbard

Geography of Svalbard

- Svalbard is: an archipelago and area of limited sovereignty of Norway
- Location:
  - Northern Hemisphere and Eastern Hemisphere
    - Europe
      - Northern Europe
  - Arctic Ocean
  - Time zone: Central European Time (UTC+01), Central European Summer Time (UTC+02)
  - Extreme points of Svalbard
    - High: Newtontoppen 1,717 m (5,633 ft)
    - Low: Arctic Ocean 0 m
  - Land boundaries: none
  - Coastline: 3,587 km
- Population of Svalbard:
- Area of Svalbard: 61,022 km^{2}
- Atlas of Svalbard

=== Environment of Svalbard ===
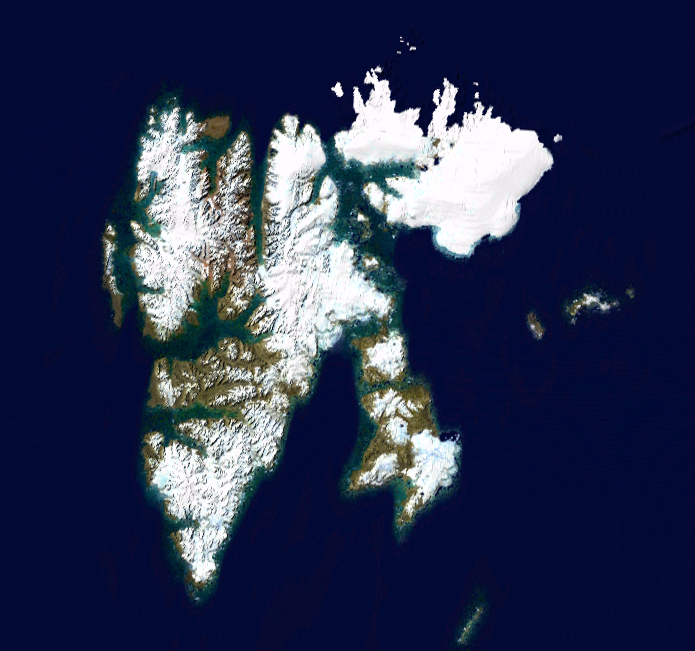
An enlargeable satellite image of Svalbard

Environment of Svalbard

- Climate of Svalbard
- Wildlife of Svalbard
  - Flora of Svalbard
- World Heritage Sites in Svalbard: None

=== Demography of Svalbard ===
Demographics of Svalbard

== Government and politics of Svalbard ==
Politics of Svalbard

- Form of government:
- Capital of Svalbard: Longyearbyen
- Elections in Svalbard
- Political parties in Svalbard

=== Branches of the government of Svalbard ===
Government of Svalbard

==== Government of Svalbard ====
- Governor of Svalbard: Kjerstin Askholt
- Longyearbyen Community Council

==== Judicial branch of the government of Svalbard ====
Court system of Svalbard

- Supreme Court of Svalbard

=== Foreign relations of Svalbard ===
Foreign relations of Svalbard

- Diplomatic missions in Svalbard
- Diplomatic missions of Svalbard

==== International organization membership ====
- none

=== Law and order in Svalbard ===
Law of Svalbard

- Cannabis in Svalbard
- Constitution of Svalbard
- Crime in Svalbard
- Human rights in Svalbard
  - LGBT rights in Svalbard
  - Freedom of religion in Svalbard
- Law enforcement in Svalbard

=== Military of Svalbard ===
Svalbard is a designated demilitarized zone.

=== Local government in Svalbard ===
Local government in Svalbard

== History of Svalbard ==
History of Svalbard

- Timeline of the history of Svalbard
- Military history of Svalbard

== Culture of Svalbard ==
- Cuisine of Svalbard
- Languages of Svalbard
- National symbols of Svalbard
  - Coat of arms of Svalbard
  - Flag of Svalbard
- World Heritage Sites in Svalbard: None

== Economy and infrastructure of Svalbard ==
Economy of Svalbard

- Economic rank, by nominal GDP (2007):
- Agriculture in Svalbard
- Banking in Svalbard
  - National Bank of Svalbard
- Communications in Svalbard
  - Internet in Svalbard
- Companies of Svalbard
- Currency of Svalbard: Krone
  - ISO 4217: NOK
- Energy in Svalbard
  - Energy policy of Svalbard
  - Oil industry in Svalbard
- Mining in Svalbard
- Svalbard Stock Exchange
- Tourism in Svalbard
- Transport in Svalbard
  - Airports in Svalbard

== Education in Svalbard ==
Education in Svalbard

== See also ==
Svalbard

- Index of Svalbard-related articles
- List of international rankings
- Outline of Europe
- Outline of geography
- Outline of Norway
