= Agriculture in Svalbard =

Svalbard's agriculture

Agriculture in Svalbard – the archipelago containing the world's northernmost permanently inhabited settlements – has a short history, and remains a minor economic factor, but has nonetheless had a culturally and socially significant role, as well as an ecologic impact. Svalbard is home to the Global Seed Vault, which serves to protect the world's biological and agricultural diversity. Polar Permaculture Solutions, AS was formed in January 2015. Polar Permaculture has been focused on producing locally grown food in town, and also with composting food waste.

== Conditions ==
Svalbard, an archipelago administered by Norway and located far north of continental Europe in the Arctic Ocean, has a geography and climate largely unsuited for agriculture. Glacial ice covers 60% of its landmass, 30% is barren rock, and only 10% is vegetated. No arable land exists, and the mean average temperature during July – the warmest month, which is part of a three-month period of midnight sun – is only 5.8 °C (44.4 °F). The islands are only around 800 miles (1,100 km) from the North Pole.

The indigenous fauna is limited, with few mammal land species and only a single wintering bird species. The flora is highly biologically diverse, but relatively scarce.

== History ==
The archipelago was first subjected to minor human settlement in the 17th century, in the form of temporary whaling, fishing and hunting settlements (such as Smeerenburg). The first permanent settlements arose in the late 19th century, with the advent of tourism and large-scale coal mining. Despite the environmental limitations, several farms have existed on Svalbard since then, mainly providing fresh produce to a diet largely dependent on imported, conserved foods. Initial attempts to practice field growing of potatoes failed, leading Svalbard's agriculture to take the form of greenhouse growing and indoor animal husbandry.

=== Longyearbyen ===
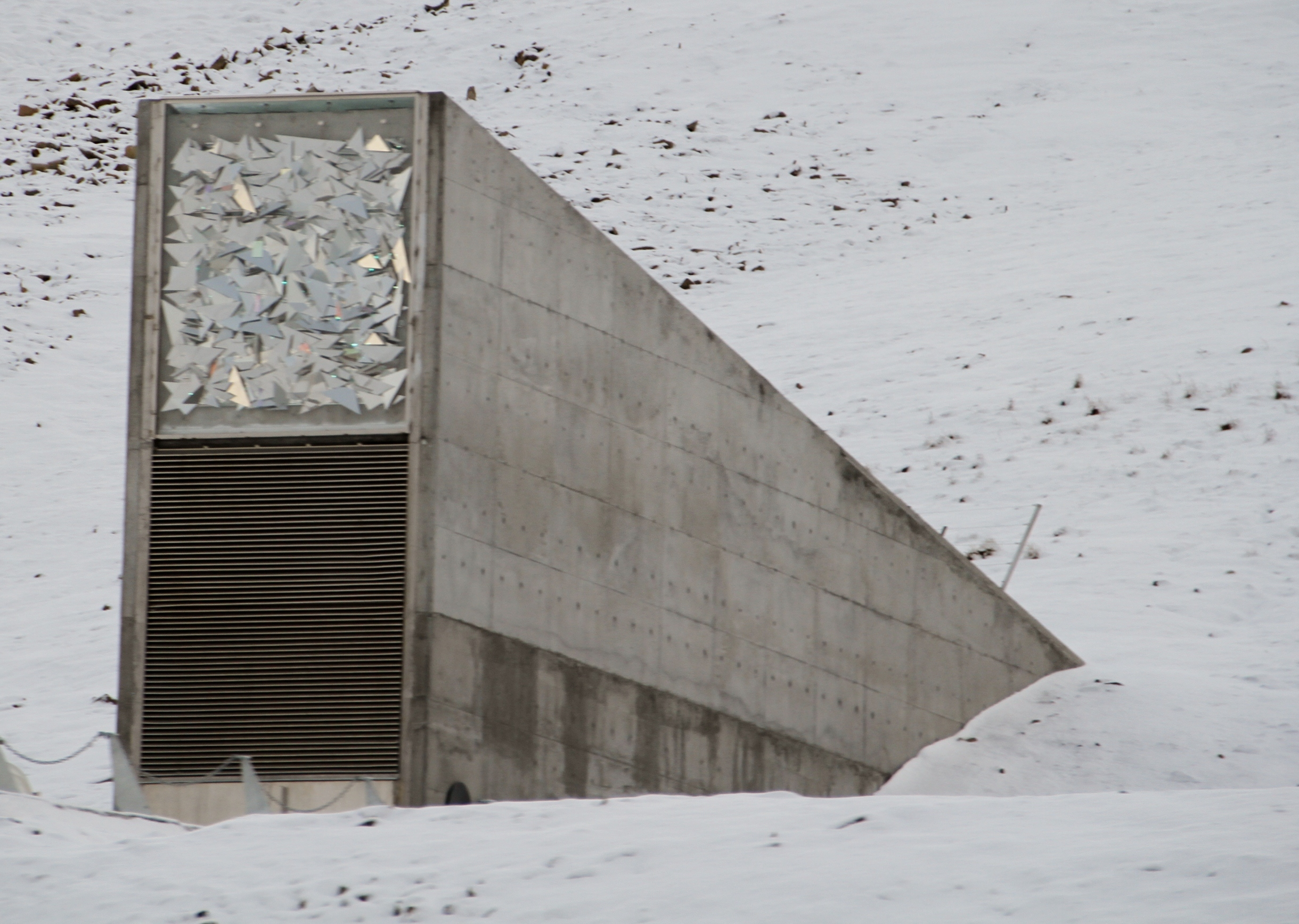
The Svalbard Global Seed Vault, 2012

There used to be a farm in the central settlement and administrative capital of Svalbard, Longyearbyen. First inhabited in 1896, the town became a prominent Norwegian centre for coal mining. Almost entirely destroyed during World War II, it saw significant expansion and population increase in the immediate post-war era. In 1949 a farm was built, intended to hold dairy cattle, pigs and hens. It was shut down in the 1960s, and replaced with a facility for the industrial liquifying of powdered milk. The farm building was later used to house the Svalbard Museum for about thirty years, until 2006. Since 2008 it instead houses the Spitsbergen Airship Museum. Other domesticated animals are kept in modern Longyearbyen – which is home to an Icelandic horse stable and several Greenland Dog kennels – but these are raised for purely recreational purposes.

Since 1984, the Nordic Gene Bank has stored backup Nordic plant germplasm in the form of frozen seeds in Svalbard, over the years depositing more than 10,000 seed samples of more than 2,000 cultivars for 300 different species. In 2006 the construction of the Global Seed Vault, a secure underground vault located outside of Longyearbyen, began. The purpose is to provide a safety net against accidental loss of biological diversity in traditional genebanks, acting to ensure crop diversity in the future. Opened in 2008, the seed bank now contains over 750,000 different types of seeds. A study has shown that the vault could preserve most major food crops' seeds for centuries. Others, some of them important grains, could possibly survive for thousands of years.

=== Soviet Union ===
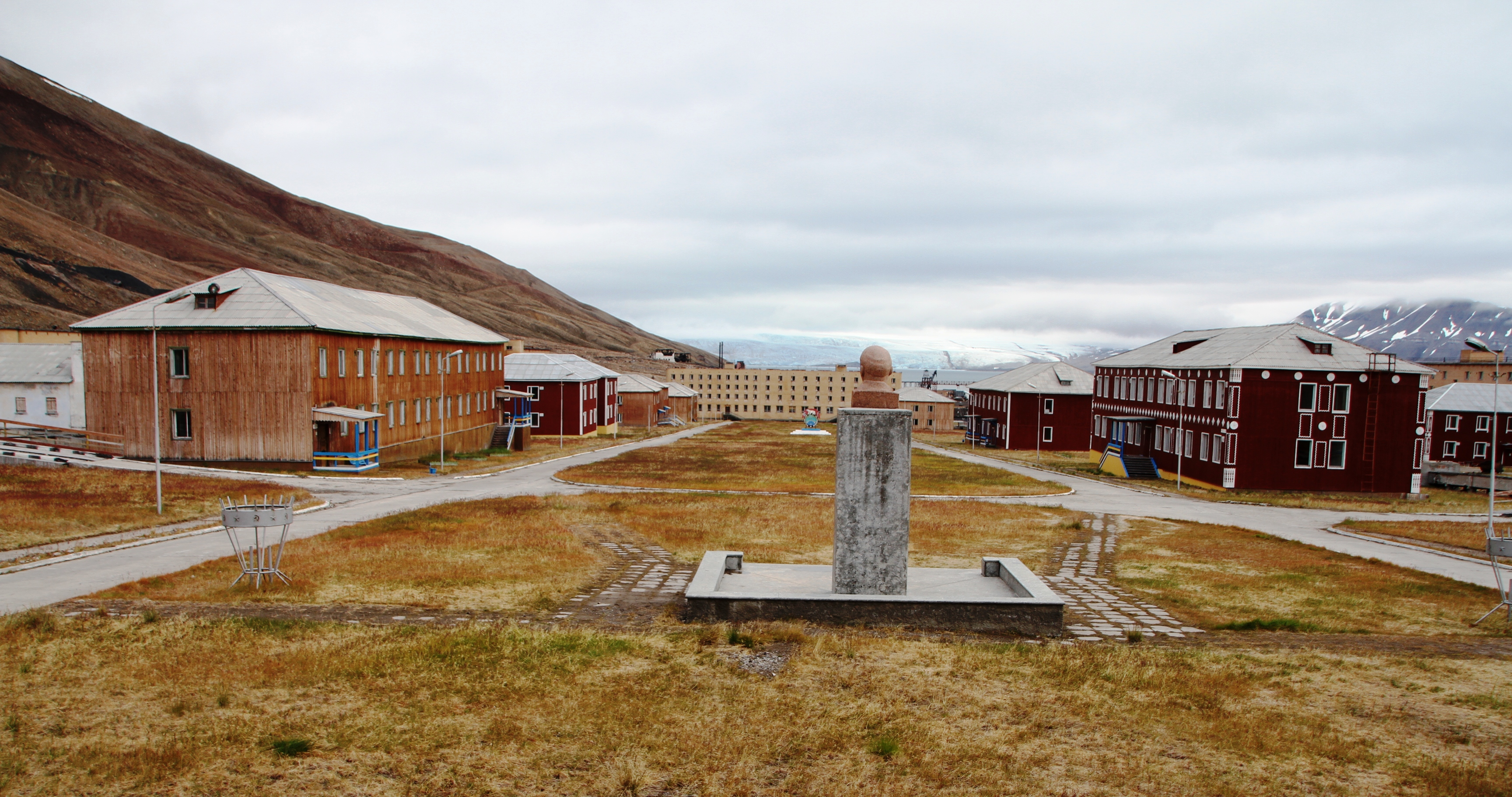
Pyramiden's central square, 2012

The former Soviet Union (USSR) possessed several mining settlements on Svalbard. These were administered largely without Norwegian oversight, and according to Soviet societal norms. They included Barentsburg, Grumant, and Pyramiden. Out of these, at least two had farms – Pyramiden and Barentsburg. Pyramiden, established by Sweden in 1910 and sold to the USSR in 1927, had over a thousand inhabitants in its heyday. Its agriculture was organized along the lines of Soviet collective farming, and included a vegetable greenhouse and an animal farm housing dairy cattle, pigs, hens and a single horse. For some time, the production surplus was such that eggs could be exported to Longyearbyen. Farming continued following the dissolution of the Soviet Union, until the settlement was closed down in 1998.

Barentsburg, the second Soviet settlement with a collective farm, was started by the Dutch in the 1920s and sold to the USSR in 1932. It is the sole ex-Soviet town on Svalbard which is still active, Arktikugol having continued the coal mining operations under Russian ownership. The population was once several thousand strong, but is now down to a few hundred. A farm producing vegetables and animal products was established as in Pyramiden, and remains in operation albeit at a smaller scale. In 1988 the farm kept poultry, cattle and pigs, each type of livestock numbering in the tens. Today only the latter remains, in small numbers. The farm, which went through a strong reduction in animal numbers during the harsh winter of 2003–2004, grows for example tomatoes, onions, and peppers. The greenhouse is deemed a necessity, due to the fact that Barentsburg is almost completely isolated from food deliveries during the winter months.

Soviet agriculture on Svalbard has had a significant impact on the archipelago's ecosystem, through both intentional and accidental introduction of alien species. An example of the former can be found in Pyramiden, where Svalbard reindeer can be seen grazing on the central square's overgrown lawns, in which Ukrainian grass grows on dark, fertile soil likewise imported from Ukraine. An example of the latter is the southern vole, introduced in Grumant – a town founded in 1912 and abandoned in 1965, with a peak population of about eleven hundred. The species, which arrived in hay shipments intended as fodder for the coal mine's horses, is now established, and is one of just three wild terrestrial mammals on Svalbard.

== See also ==
- Agriculture in Greenland
- Agriculture in the Soviet Union
- Economy of Svalbard
