= Cannabis in Svalbard =

Cannabis in Svalbard is illegal. Practically functioning as ungoverned terra nullius prior to the Svalbard Treaty of 1920, the Arctic Ocean archipelago dominated by glaciers and barren rock, is part of Norway, and hence Norwegian law applies. Under it, there is a sliding scale approach to cannabis legislation. Possession for personal use, defined as up to 15 grams, is punished with a fine of between roughly 1,500 and 15,000 Norwegian kroner. Possession of amounts larger than that is punished by jail, ranging from 6 months up to 21 years. These laws are enforced by the Norwegian Police Service, the small Svalbard district of which is run by the Governor of Svalbard.

== Context ==
With the exception of minor scientific stations, Svalbard has three main permanently inhabited settlements – the administrative capital Longyearbyen, the Russian coal mining town Barentsburg, and the small research settlement Ny-Ålesund. As of 1 July 2015, the archipelago's total population is 2,677 people, in addition to large numbers of temporary workers and tourists. The use of illegal drugs is a small but growing issue within Svalbard's society, according to the Longyearbyen Community Council. While there is reportedly little evidence of an active narcotics trade in Longyearbyen, authorities are encouraged to pay close attention to the increasing liberalization of opinions relating to drug use among Svalbard's youths, and ample amounts of substance abuse prevention measures have been enacted. A 2013 survey has shown that cannabis consumption among youths on Svalbard is somewhat lower than among youths on the Norwegian mainland, although certainly still existent. Significantly, only 7% of those surveyed stated that a belief that they – if they wanted to – could procure cannabis within a couple of days, compared to 41% of youths on the mainland.

== 2011 bust ==
In 2011 the police made one of Svalbard's first drug busts, in which a total of 11 people were apprehended under suspicion of both using and selling cannabis. They were charged with a total of 24 offenses, which resulted in a 26 percent rise in the regional crime rate that year. One of them was later expelled from the archipelago, and another given a preliminary warning of expulsion. That autumn, the Governor of Svalbard officially announced the presence of illegal drugs among "young adults" in Longyearbyen. Following a lengthy investigation, a similar drug bust was made in October 2015, when a multi-national group of 11 men and women in their twenties were arrested and charged with, primarily, possession of cannabis, with some suspicion of cocaine usage as well. Several of those apprehended were given fines ranging between 4,000 and 9,000 Norwegian kroner. Whether any of them are to be expelled from Svalbard is currently under investigation. Following this event, an online poll run by the local newspaper Svalbardposten showed that 86% of respondents favored expulsion for drug crimes, although some sentiment towards legalization or decriminalization was also found. The Governor of Svalbard, Kjerstin Askholt, stated that her administration has zero-tolerance policy towards illegal drugs, and "will do what we can to prevent a drugs culture from establishing itself here".

== Svalbard Global Seed Vault ==
While cannabis is strictly illegal in Svalbard, there is one place in the archipelago that possesses an amount of it – the Svalbard Global Seed Vault. A seed bank located outside of Longyearbyen, the secure vault contains thousands of seeds from around the world, in order to ensure their preservation in case of other seed banks being destroyed or damaged during large-scale regional or global crises. Among the species of plant preserved in the vault are around 21,500 seeds belonging to the cannabis genus, donated in 2014. The seeds were provided by Alchimia, a Spanish seed bank.

== See also ==
- Cannabis by province and territory
