= Climate of Svalbard =

Svalbard and Europe map

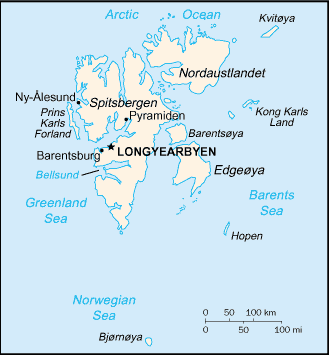
Map of Svalbard

Svalbard is a Norwegian archipelago in the Arctic Ocean. The climate of Svalbard is principally a result of its latitude, which is between 74° and 81° north. Climate is defined by the World Meteorological Organization as the average weather over a 30-year period. The North Atlantic Current moderates Svalbard's temperatures, particularly during winter, giving it up to 20 °C (36 °F) higher winter temperature than similar latitudes in continental Russia and Canada. This keeps the surrounding waters open and navigable most of the year. The interior fjord areas and valleys, sheltered by the mountains, have fewer temperature differences than the coast, with about 2 °C lower summer temperatures and 3 °C higher winter temperatures. On the south of the largest island, Spitsbergen, the temperature is slightly higher than further north and west. During winter, the temperature difference between south and north is typically 5 °C, and about 3 °C in summer. Bear Island (Bjørnøya) has average temperatures even higher than the rest of the archipelago.

Svalbard is located in between two ocean currents – the warm Atlantic West Spitsbergen Current and the cold Arctic East Spitsbergen Current. These currents have a large impact on the climate of Svalbard and in the distribution of sea ice. The warm Atlantic current on the west coast leads to an average sea temperature of 5–7 °C. This causes a difference in sea ice distribution on Svalbard, with the east coast having a significantly larger area of ice-covered sea than the west coast.

== Historical data ==
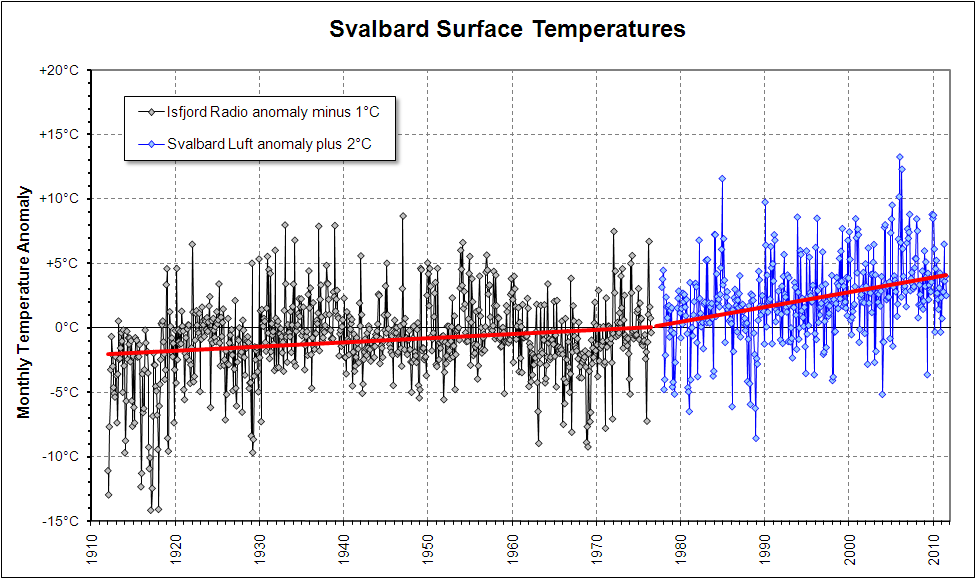

Due to its history of human occupation, Svalbard has one of the longest high-latitude meteorological records on earth. Computer models of global climate have long predicted enhanced greenhouse warming at such latitudes, so the Svalbard record is of particular interest. It shows approximately 6 °C (10.8 °F) increase in 100 years; with 4 °C (7.2 °F) increase in the last 30 years.

Meteorological data for Svalbard dates back to 1911. 60% of the archipelago is covered by glaciers, so by drilling for ice cores the climate before this time can be studied. Ice cores on Svalbard can reveal the climate going back 1,000 years, to the end of the Viking era. The Norwegian Polar Institute's research found that 1,000 years ago the climate on Svalbard was mild, allowing the seas to be navigable. This warmer climate lasted until the 1200s. After this time the climate was in a cold period, or a mini ice age, apart from around the 1750s when the climate was warmer. Data from ice cores has found the 20th century was the warmest century in the last 600 years.

== Meteorology ==
Average summer temperatures on Svalbard range from 3 to 7 °C (37.4 to 44.6 °F) in July, and winter temperatures from −13 to −20 °C (8.6 to −4.0 °F) in January. The highest temperature ever recorded was 23.0 °C (73.4 °F) in July 2020 and the coldest was −46.3 °C (−51.3 °F) in March 1986. The archipelago is the meeting place for cold polar air from the north and mild, wet sea air from the south. This creates low pressure and changeable weather with high wind speeds, particularly in winter; in January, a strong breeze is registered 17% of the time at Isfjord Radio, but only 1% of the time in July. In summer, particularly away from land, fog is common, with visibility under 1 kilometre (0.62 mi) registered 20% of the time in July and 1% of the time in January, at Hopen and Bear Island. Precipitation is frequent, but falls in small quantities, typically less than 400 millimetres (15.7 in) in Western Spitsbergen. More rain falls in the uninhabited east side, where there can be more than 1,000 millimetres (39.4 in).

Traditionally weather had been forecast for Spitsbergen, which because of the needs of expeditions and the governor's activities gave the most extreme weather on the archipelago. This included forecasts for weather-exposed locations such as Hinlopen, Sørkapp and Danes Island. As most people live in the sheltered area of Nordenskiöld Land, the forecast was often regarded as irrelevant. The Norwegian Meteorological Institute started from 14 October 2011 issuing two forecasts, one which is publicly broadcast and covers the main settlements of Longyearbyen, Barentsburg and Svea ("Nordenskiöld Land"), and one that covers the entire archipelago ("Spitsbergen").

== Temperature averages for selected settlements ==
Climate data for Barentsburg
Month	Jan	Feb	Mar	Apr	May	Jun	Jul	Aug	Sep	Oct	Nov	Dec	Year
Mean daily maximum °C (°F)	−9.1 (15.6)	−9.4 (15.1)	−9.4 (15.1)	−6.4 (20.5)	−1.1 (30.0)	4.0 (39.2)	8.4 (47.1)	7.2 (45.0)	2.9 (37.2)	−2.6 (27.3)	−5.1 (22.8)	−7.4 (18.7)	−2.3 (27.9)
Mean daily minimum °C (°F)	−15.2 (4.6)	−15.7 (3.7)	−15.5 (4.1)	−12.1 (10.2)	−5.1 (22.8)	0.8 (33.4)	4.4 (39.9)	3.6 (38.5)	−0.4 (31.3)	−6.6 (20.1)	−10.1 (13.8)	−12.9 (8.8)	−7.1 (19.2)
Source: Pogoda.ru.net

Climate data for Longyearbyen
Month	Jan	Feb	Mar	Apr	May	Jun	Jul	Aug	Sep	Oct	Nov	Dec	Year
Mean daily maximum °C (°F)	−13.0 (8.6)	−13.0 (8.6)	−13.0 (8.6)	−9.0 (15.8)	−3.0 (26.6)	3.0 (37.4)	7.0 (44.6)	6.0 (42.8)	1.0 (33.8)	−4.0 (24.8)	−8.0 (17.6)	−11.0 (12.2)	−4.7 (23.5)
Mean daily minimum °C (°F)	−20.0 (−4.0)	−21.0 (−5.8)	−20.0 (−4.0)	−16.0 (3.2)	−7.0 (19.4)	−1.0 (30.2)	3.0 (37.4)	2.0 (35.6)	−3.0 (26.6)	−9.0 (15.8)	−14.0 (6.8)	−18.0 (−0.4)	−10.3 (13.4)
Source: Climate and daylight in Svalbard (Longyearbyen)

Climate data for Ny-Ålesund
Month	Jan	Feb	Mar	Apr	May	Jun	Jul	Aug	Sep	Oct	Nov	Dec	Year
Mean daily maximum °C (°F)	−11 (12)	−12 (10)	−11 (12)	−8 (18)	−1 (30)	2 (36)	6 (43)	5 (41)	1 (34)	−5 (23)	−8 (18)	−11 (12)	−4 (25)
Mean daily minimum °C (°F)	−13 (9)	−16 (3)	−14 (7)	−11 (12)	−3 (27)	1 (34)	4 (39)	3 (37)	−2 (28)	−7 (19)	−11 (12)	−14 (7)	−6 (21)
Source: Ny-Ålesund, Norway Travel Weather Averages

Climate data for Sveagruva
Month	Jan	Feb	Mar	Apr	May	Jun	Jul	Aug	Sep	Oct	Nov	Dec	Year
Mean daily maximum °C (°F)	−13 (9)	−13 (9)	−13 (9)	−9 (16)	−3 (27)	3 (37)	7 (45)	6 (43)	2 (36)	−4 (25)	−8 (18)	−11 (12)	−3 (27)
Mean daily minimum °C (°F)	−20 (−4)	−21 (−6)	−20 (−4)	−16 (3)	−7 (19)	−1 (30)	3 (37)	2 (36)	−3 (27)	−9 (16)	−14 (7)	−18 (0)	−9.5 (14.9)
Source: Sveagruva Climate Guide

== Climate change ==
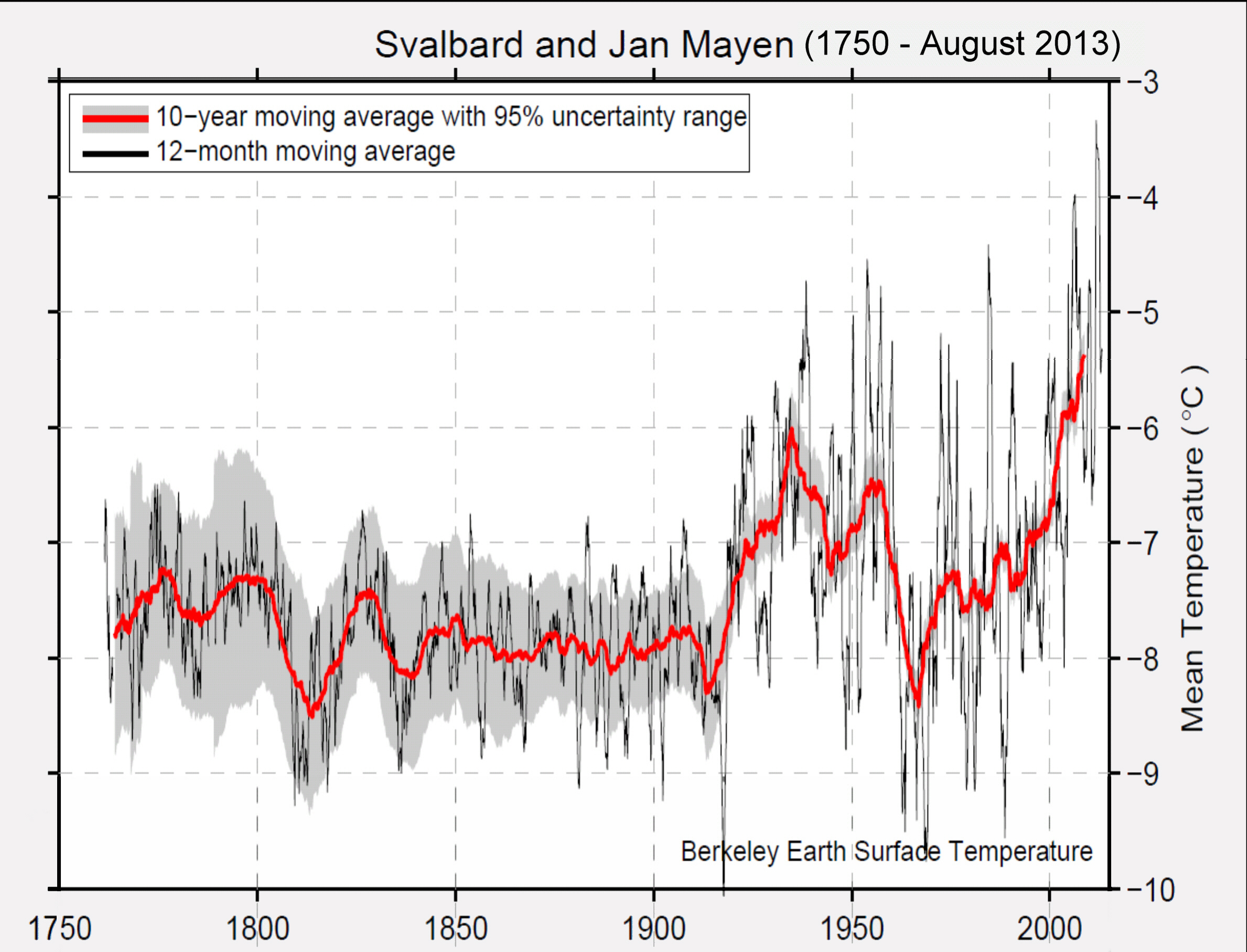
Temperature change in Jan Mayen and Svalbard 1750–2013

The Arctic region is particularly vulnerable to climate change because the surface air temperatures are increasing at twice the global rate. The special climate of Svalbard – which includes the winter with perpetual darkness (October–February) and summer with perpetual light (April–August) – has a clear effect on the ecology, with many of the endemic species specially adapted to survive the harsh environment.

Svalbard also has among the world's fastest-moving glaciers. Since the landmass is warming at double the global rate, the sheer amount of spring meltwater that runs under the ice lubricates the bedrock enough to make the glaciers surge forward at 25 meters per day during the warm periods.

=== Permafrost ===
Permafrost is ground that is permanently frozen, which most of the land in the Arctic is. Monitoring of permafrost in Svalbard is an ongoing process and is mostly done in boreholes. Janssonhaugen, 20 km from Longyearbyen, is a popular monitoring site. There is usually no disturbance to the progress of the temperature thanks to no significant or no circulation of groundwater in the cold permafrost. This makes it easier to observe the changes in the temperature at a depth of 30–40 meters. Through the collected data, the changes in temperature that have taken place near the surface over the past 10–20 years can be calculated. Permafrost monitoring began in 1998 and analyses since then have shown that the temperature is rising. On average the upper part of the permafrost temperature is rising by 0.8 °C per decade and has been accelerating during the past decade.

The rise in the air temperature is one of the main reasons for the permafrost thawing at Janssonhaugen. Since all buildings, roads, bridges, airports and other infrastructure are built on permafrost in Svalbard there will be consequences. When warming and thawing of permafrost occurs buildings and infrastructure will be affected and more unstable. Permafrost is essential for stabilising steep mountainsides, which may also become more unstable and cause landslides in the summer. Thawing of permafrost is directly connected with warmer summers. Due to the risk of increasing erosion in the summer, many cultural heritage remains that are situated in the shore zone may be vulnerable and at risk. The most important consequence, on a circumpolar level, is if the deeper layers of the permafrost thaw. Large volumes of greenhouse gases such as CO_{2} (carbon dioxide) and CH_{4} (methane) may then be released. These gases have been stored in the frozen ground, but when the ground is thawing they are released into the atmosphere. This may lead to a further rise in temperature and more thawing of the permafrost, creating a positive feedback mechanism.

=== Snow cover ===
Snow cover is an indicator of climate change since it is controlled by both precipitation and temperature. The snow cover and the length it lies on the ground is important to monitor for a number of elements that affect terrestrial ecosystems. The albedo is reduced when the period of snow-covered ground is shortened, creating a positive feedback mechanism for the climate, one of the main reasons for monitoring it. Reduced snow cover during spring might also lead to enhanced thawing of permafrost and affect conditions for plants and animals. This includes prolonging the growing season and damage to plants as they will lack the protection from snow and therefore get frost damage.

=== Ecology ===
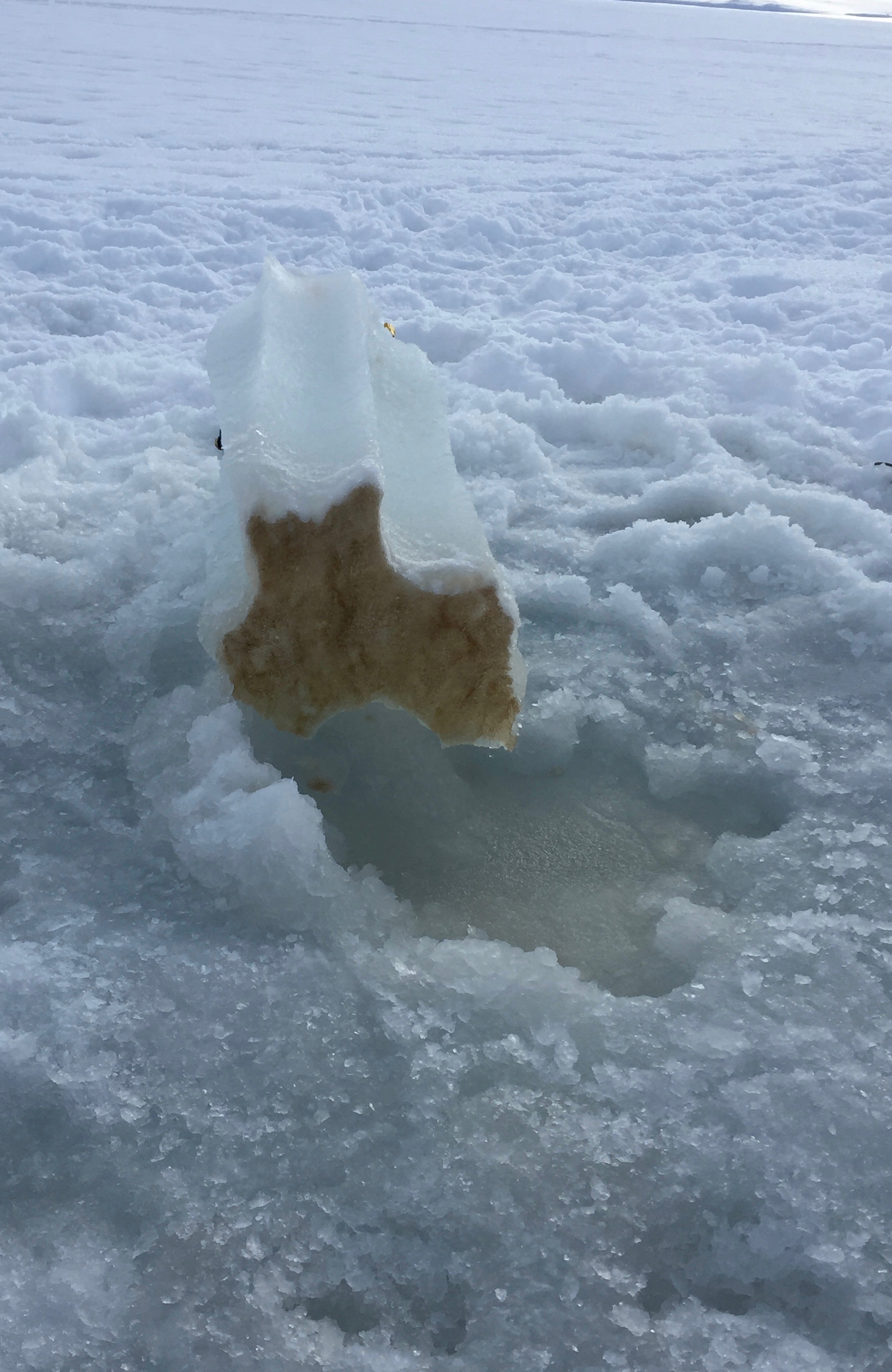
Ice algae on Svalbard

In the spring, life on Svalbard explodes. A chain of events that begins under the ice is the starting signal – the ice algal spring bloom. The increasing day length triggers the growth of nutritious ice-algae. The ice slowly melts from underneath and the algae use the sun's energy to photosynthesise. This increased food availability causes tiny crustaceans called copepods to come up from the dark depths and start feeding on the ice-algae. Soon there are millions of them, and they will store the algae's energy in form of droplets of fat in their small bodies.

When April comes, the sea ice finally begins to break apart, and the energy stored in the copepods is now available for organisms higher up the food chain. The copepods are an important food source for many species. Soon after around 6 million migratory birds return to Svalbard. The birds feed on the increasing fish populations, who timed their arrival to coincide with the increased food in Svalbard's rich waters.

Small changes in temperatures can make a big difference when it comes to a species specially adapted phenology, especially when the period for life to thrive is a short one, as it is in Svalbard. The migratory birds, for example, only have a few months before they need to return to their warmer winter homes and then the hatchlings need to be ready for the long journey. Small seasonal shifts can make a species miss the peak of resources, which they need to feed their offspring if they are going to be strong enough to survive. Bad timing in phenology can have a cascade effect higher up in the food chain as well.

==== Terrestrial ecology ====
Climate change, in the form of rising temperatures, will also increase the number of 'rain-on-snow' events during the winter of Svalbard. This has consequences for herbivores – like the endemic Svalbard reindeer and Svalbard rock ptarmigan – that are dependent on the scattered plants and fauna as their only food source during the winter. With more frequent rain events, these plants are now spending more time under a thick layer of newly frozen ice, which the herbivores cannot access.

A species that benefits from the rising temperatures on Svalbard is the migratory pink-footed goose (Anser brachyrhynchus). The reduction of terrestrial ice cover in spring means that the birds can start nesting earlier and there are more breeding pairs, which results in a higher rate of breeding success. This however has some consequences for the terrestrial vegetation sustainability and the ecosystem balance. With an increasing population of herbivores like the pink-footed goose the competition for primary produced food will increase and affect other herbivorous species and their related predators.

===== Terrestrial invasive species =====
Being an isolated group of islands, migrating to Svalbard is difficult for terrestrial species. The main threat of introducing alien species relates to human activities. People can introduce species intentionally but unintentional introduction is probably more common. A study focusing on the shoes worn by people arriving at Svalbard revealed a great number of different species of plants. Seeds and bryophytes were analyzed and categorized as belonging to 18 different families and 41 different species. Introduced alien species pose a threat of becoming invasive if they are fortunate enough in adapting to the new environment.

==== Marine ecology ====
===== Phytoplankton and zooplankton =====
The warming temperature and the resulting effects on the ice cover in the Arctic could affect the organisms involved in primary productivity – the phytoplankton and zooplankton. As a result of reduced sea-ice and consequent longer growing season, the yield of phytoplankton may be higher in some areas. Primary production has increased in the Arctic by around 20% from 1998 to 2009. However, different trends are observed in different areas as the productivity in some zones has remained unchanged or even decreased. The timing of the bloom as well as species composition has also changed over these years. In the long term this could affect the species that are directly or indirectly dependent on primary productivity, but these affects are difficult to predict. According to some ice cover predictions, it is estimated that ice algae will decrease substantially or even go extinct in the Barents Sea.

Varied results can be extrapolated from different models of zooplankton abundance with future climate change. Some estimates show total zooplankton biomass will increase and others that it will decrease. It is either way predicted that the phytoplankton and zooplankton species composition will change.

===== Ice-dependent marine mammals =====
The sea ice in the Arctic has already shown dramatic changes in both thickness and extent, and these changes are expected to continue in the coming decades. Some marine mammals that are associated with the ice have already exhibited changes in distribution, body condition and reproduction. The negative impacts in the coming decades are expected to increase and could escalate as a result of the reduction in sea-ice cover. In turn, this situation could have severe impacts on the biodiversity among the native marine mammals in the Arctic.

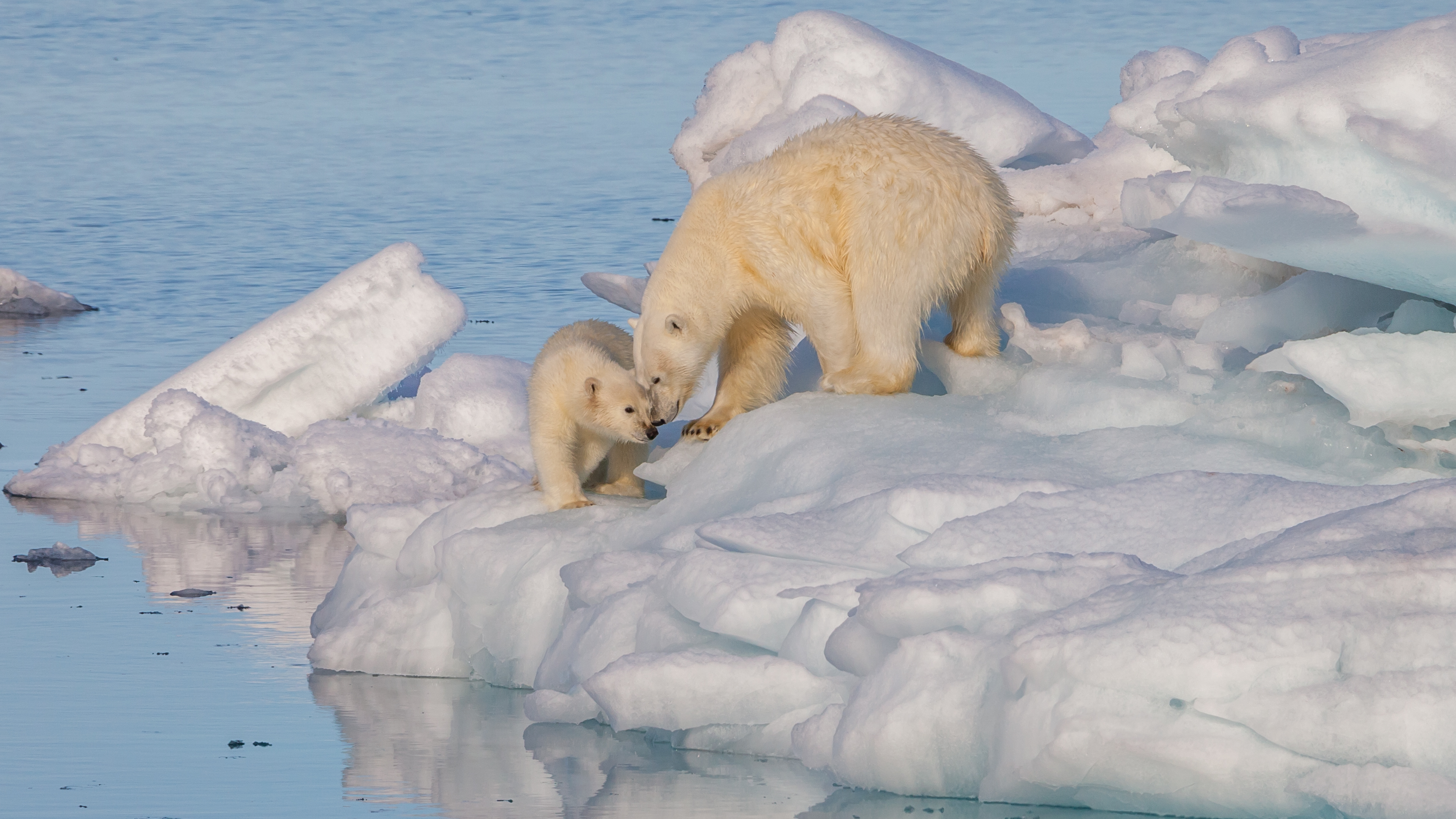
A polar bear mother and cub

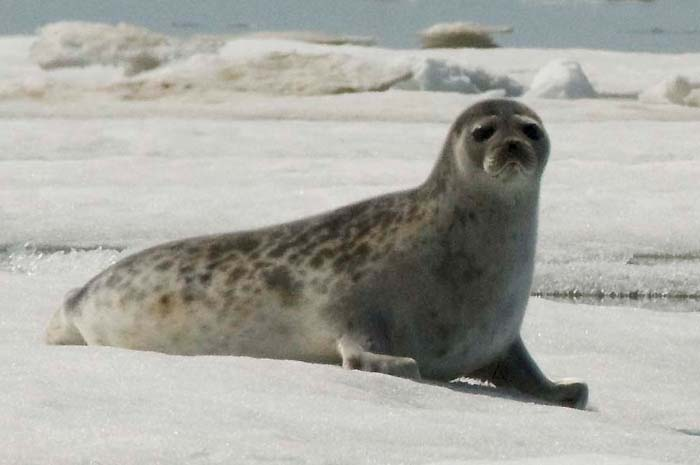
Ringed seal on the ice

Several species, particularly polar bears (Ursus maritimus) and ringed seals (Pusa hispida), require a sea ice habitat, as they follow the drifting ice northwards in the summer and return to the coastal areas when winter arrives. Therefore, changes in the sea ice cover could have a significant effect on these species.

Climate change is thought to be the biggest threat facing polar bears. In the Arctic the polar bear is a top predator that is highly dependent on sea ice to hunt. The drifting ice provides access to find its most important prey – ringed seals. Population decline, changes in behaviour and a worsening physical condition are already being observed, especially in the southern part of the species habitat range. It has been observed that climatic changes affect reproductive rates and conditions in the polar bear population in Svalbard, but many factors are interlinked and there are aspects that are not fully understood.

The ringed seal is ice-dependent and especially needs sea ice in fjords, around islands and by glaciers to breed. They give birth to pups in snow caves, and less snow and ice can mean that it becomes more difficult for them to carve a cave in connection to a breathing hole. In turn, this can mean that they are required to give birth on open ice, exposing the pups to predators as well as being unprotected from harsh weather conditions. They also rest and find food on ice, and reduced ice cover due to climate change means that both these activities are increasingly difficult. On the west coast of Svalbard, it has been observed that ringed seals have not had enough sea ice for normal reproduction since 2005 and the population is thought to be declining.

===== Marine invasive species =====
Alien or invasive marine species are primarily introduced by arriving or passing ships, and although Svalbard is one of the least affected areas in the world, in a changing climate this is subject to change. The melting of sea ice presents new possible routes for the shipping industry and perhaps more frequent exposures to biofouling and ballast water. An increase of temperature could also lead to other species being able to survive in the Arctic. Very few scientific reports have been published connected to invasive species in the Arctic and to reach a better understanding more investigation is needed.

== Human activities ==
With the melting of sea ice new possibilities for using or extracting natural resources are emerging in Svalbard. Increased use of land and sea by activities such as gas- and oil drilling, fishing and tourism could however harm the environment. There is also a large uncertainty about the impact the increase in different activities will have on the Svalbard region. Another risk with climate change is more frequently occurring extreme weather events, which can lead to damage of property and infrastructure. Higher temperatures can also lead to deeper thawing in the permafrost layer which could weaken the stability of the ground and thereby threaten buildings and roads.

=== Seed vault flooding ===
The Svalbard Global Seed Vault stores seeds from seed banks all over the world, aiming to provide a backup preservation of the legacy of plant diversity through threats such as climate change, natural disaster and human conflict. The facility should be fail-safe facing both human and natural disasters.

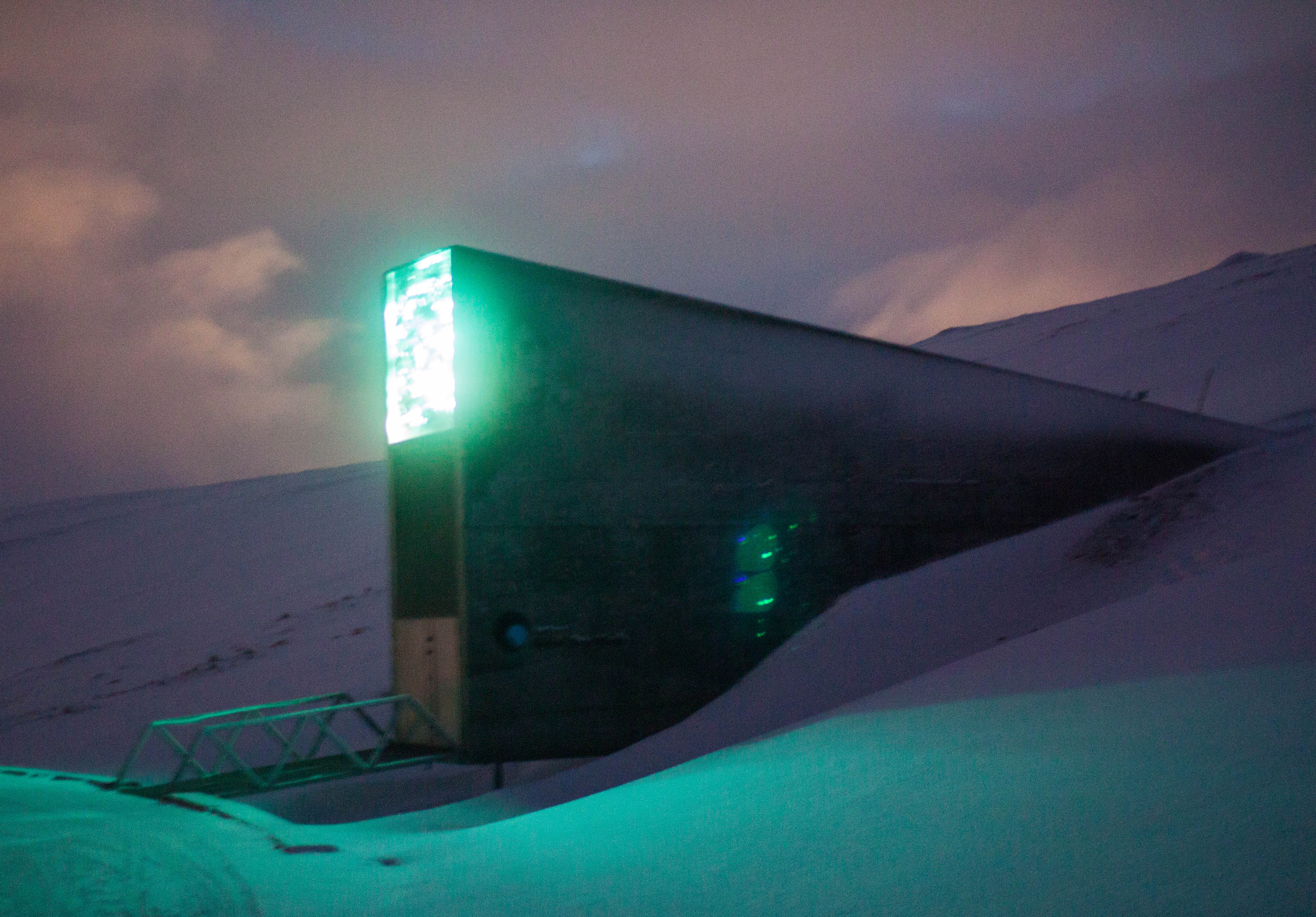
Svalbard Global Seed Vault entrance

In October 2016, temperatures higher than average in combination with heavy rainfall caused an intrusion of water to deeper areas than had previously occurred. The seeds were not affected as the design of the vault is adapted to water intrusion. However, the Norwegian public works agency, Statsbygg, is now planning improvements to the tunnel to prevent any such intrusion in the future and especially facing uncertain climate change. The Norwegian government has proposed to upgrade the Svalbard Global Seed Vault and has allocated 100 million NOK for this purpose. Technical improvements will be carried out as part of a long-term plan with the aim to extend the viability and improve the performance of the seed vault. The upgrading project includes technical improvements such as an access tunnel built in concrete and a service facility that will host emergency power and refrigerating instruments.
