= Cuisine of Svalbard =

Culinary traditions of Svalbard, Norway

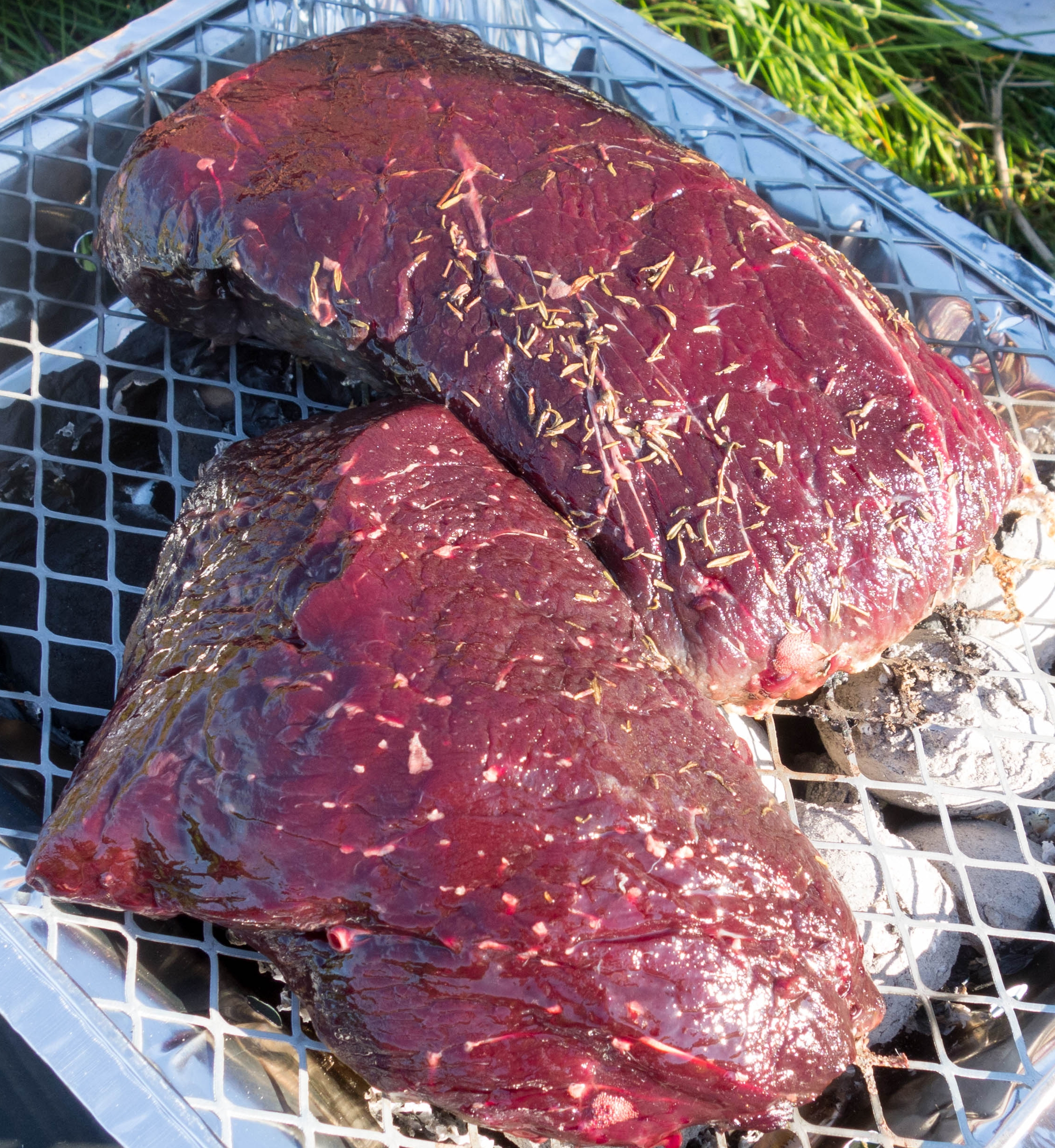
Raw whale meat

The cuisine of Svalbard can be considered a regional cuisine of Norway, as Svalbard is a part of Norway. Most food is imported to Svalbard from Norway, and the general Norwegian cuisine is commonly encountered in Svalbard, both in restaurants and in households. However, the population of the Svalbard islands is highly multicultural, which makes it possible to find dishes from many other cuisines and from the global cuisine, in restaurants (especially in Longyearbyen), such as tacos, pancakes, Thai dishes, pizza, or hamburger.

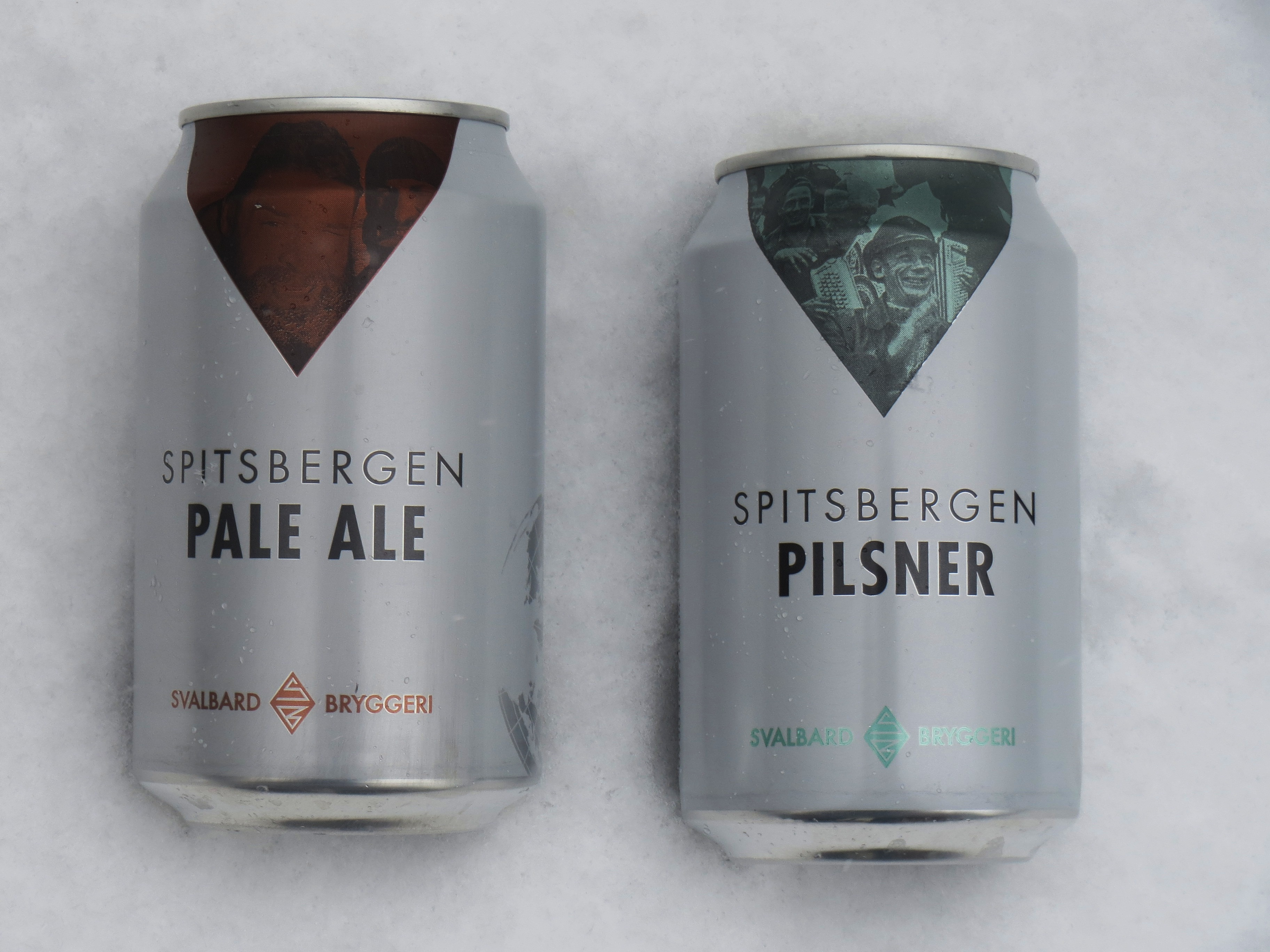
Two cans of beer from Svalbard

A distinctive feature of Svalbard cuisine is the meat of animals living in the Svalbard wilderness. The right to hunt these animals (with certain quotas on the number of individuals of each species) is granted to all residents of Svalbard, and there are also several licensed hunters on the islands. Therefore, this meat can be found both in households and, especially seasonally, in restaurants. The animals most commonly hunted for meat are reindeer, seals, and ptarmigans. Polar bear meat is served very rarely. In addition, fishing is practiced, and fish is an important part of Svalbard cuisine; for example, polar cod is popular. Svalbard also has a long history of whaling, dating back to the 17th century, and Norway is one of the last countries in the world that has not banned whaling. Minke whales are hunted for meat, and whale meat is also commonly consumed on Svalbard.

One of the most famous restaurants serving local cuisine is Huset Restaurant in Longyerbyen. Svalbard is home to a brewery (Svalbard Bryggeri in Longyearbyen, the northernmost brewery in the world). The village of Ny-Ålesund hosts a cognac distillery. Svalbard is also known for exporting clear glacial water as a luxury product under the brand Svalbarði.
