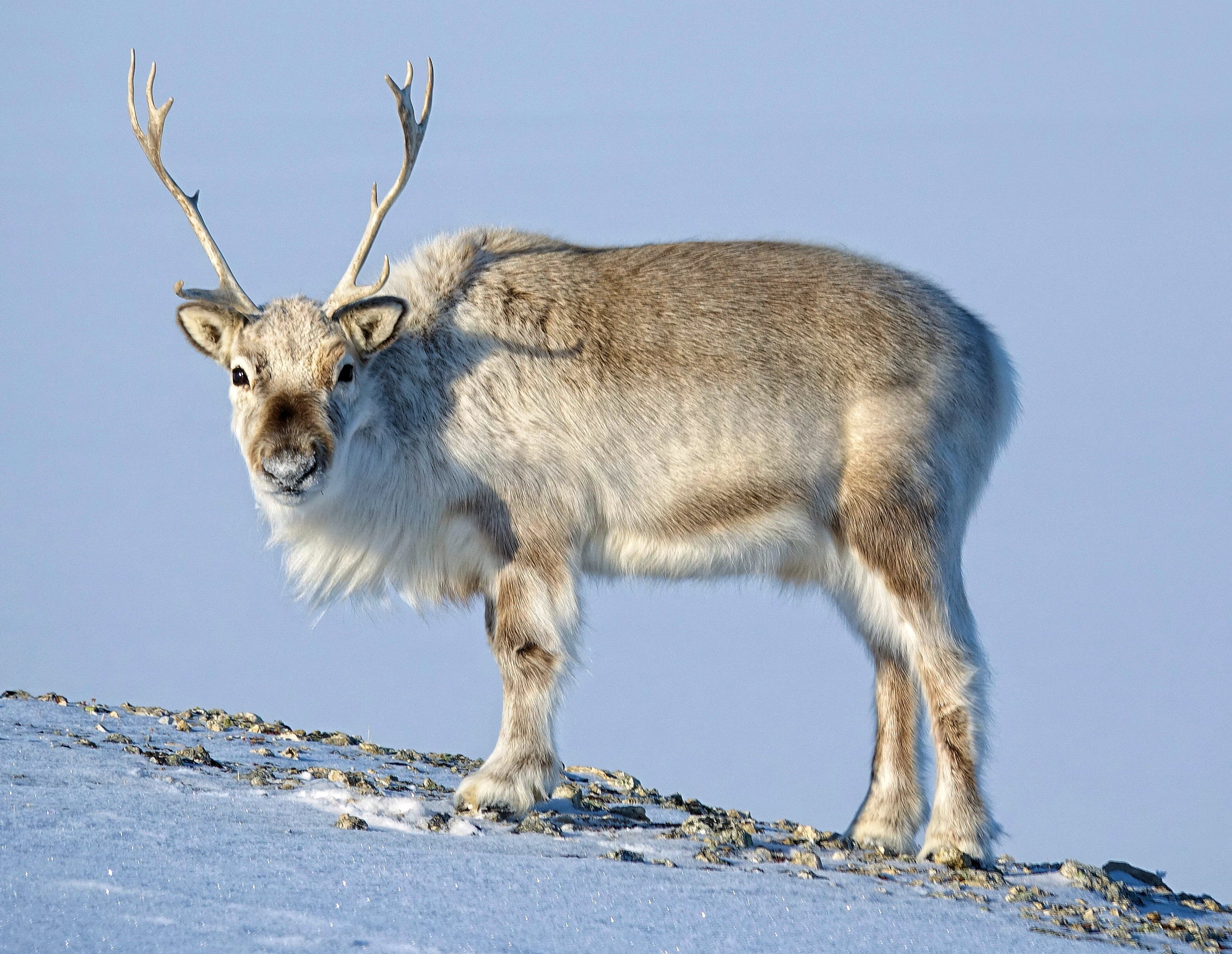
- Svalbard reindeer

Conservation status
- Vulnerable (IUCN 3.1)

Scientific classification
- Kingdom: Animalia
- Phylum: Chordata
- Class: Mammalia
- Order: Artiodactyla
- Family: Cervidae
- Subfamily: Capreolinae
- Genus: Rangifer
- Species: R. tarandus
- Subspecies: R. t. platyrhynchus

Trinomial name
- Rangifer tarandus platyrhynchus (Vrolik, 1829)

= Svalbard reindeer =

Species of deer

The Svalbard reindeer (Rangifer tarandus platyrhynchus) is a small subspecies or species of reindeer found on the Svalbard archipelago of Norway. Males average 65–90 kg (143–198 lb) in weight, females 53–70 kg (117–154 lb), while for other reindeer generally body mass is 159–182 kg (351–401 lb) for males and 80–120 kg (180–260 lb) for females.

The subspecies is endemic to the islands of Svalbard, where it has lived for at least 5,000 years and has become well adapted to the harsh climate, being found on nearly all non-glaciated areas of the archipelago. By 1925 they had almost gone extinct due to over-hunting in the late 19th and early 20th centuries. Over recent decades, their population has increased. Between 1979 and 2013 the Adventdalen population varied between 400 and 1200 individuals – similar in Reindalen. As of 2019, the total population across the archipelago is approximately 22,000. They are the only large grazing mammal in the European High Arctic, and this makes them exceptional for studies concerning the introduction of pollutants to changing ecosystems. During the short Arctic summer, Svalbard reindeer feed on a lush tundra vegetation of vascular plants, including grasses, herbs, sedges and deciduous shrubs in the lowland plains and valleys, to accumulate fat for the winter. The fur of Svalbard reindeer contains elements and chemicals picked up from the vegetation they digest. They are relatively sedentary, and are thus highly vulnerable to changes in local conditions.

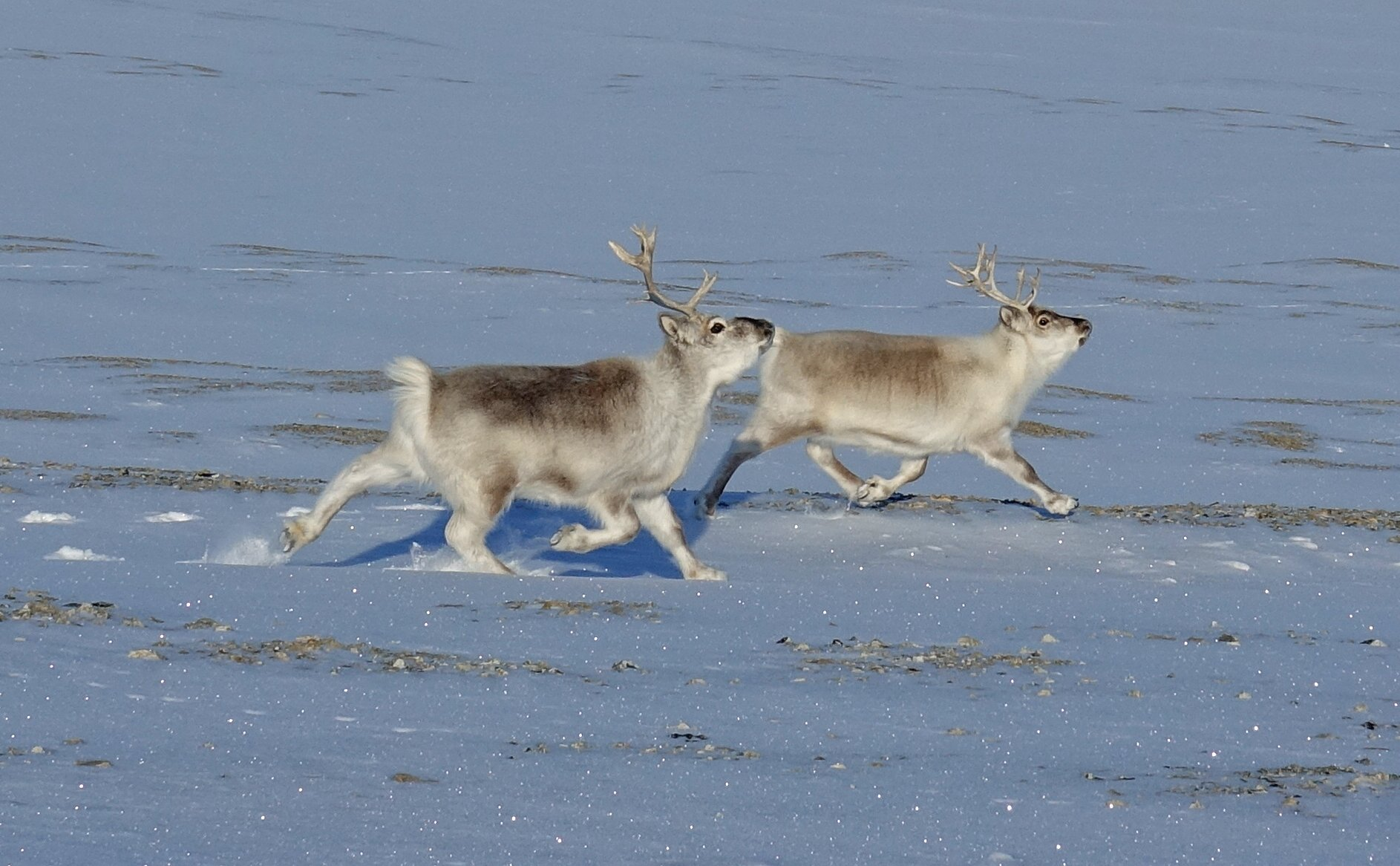
Svalbard reindeer running

Compared to other reindeer, they are short-legged and have a small, rounded head. Their fur is also lighter in color and thicker during winter. The thickness of the coat contributes to the short-legged appearance and makes even starved animals appear fat in the winter. The males develop large antlers during the period from April to July and shed the velvet during August–September. Males lose their antlers in early winter. Females develop antlers starting in June and they are usually retained for a whole year. The expected lifespan of a Svalbard reindeer is around ten years. However, the oldest animal recorded was 17 years of age.

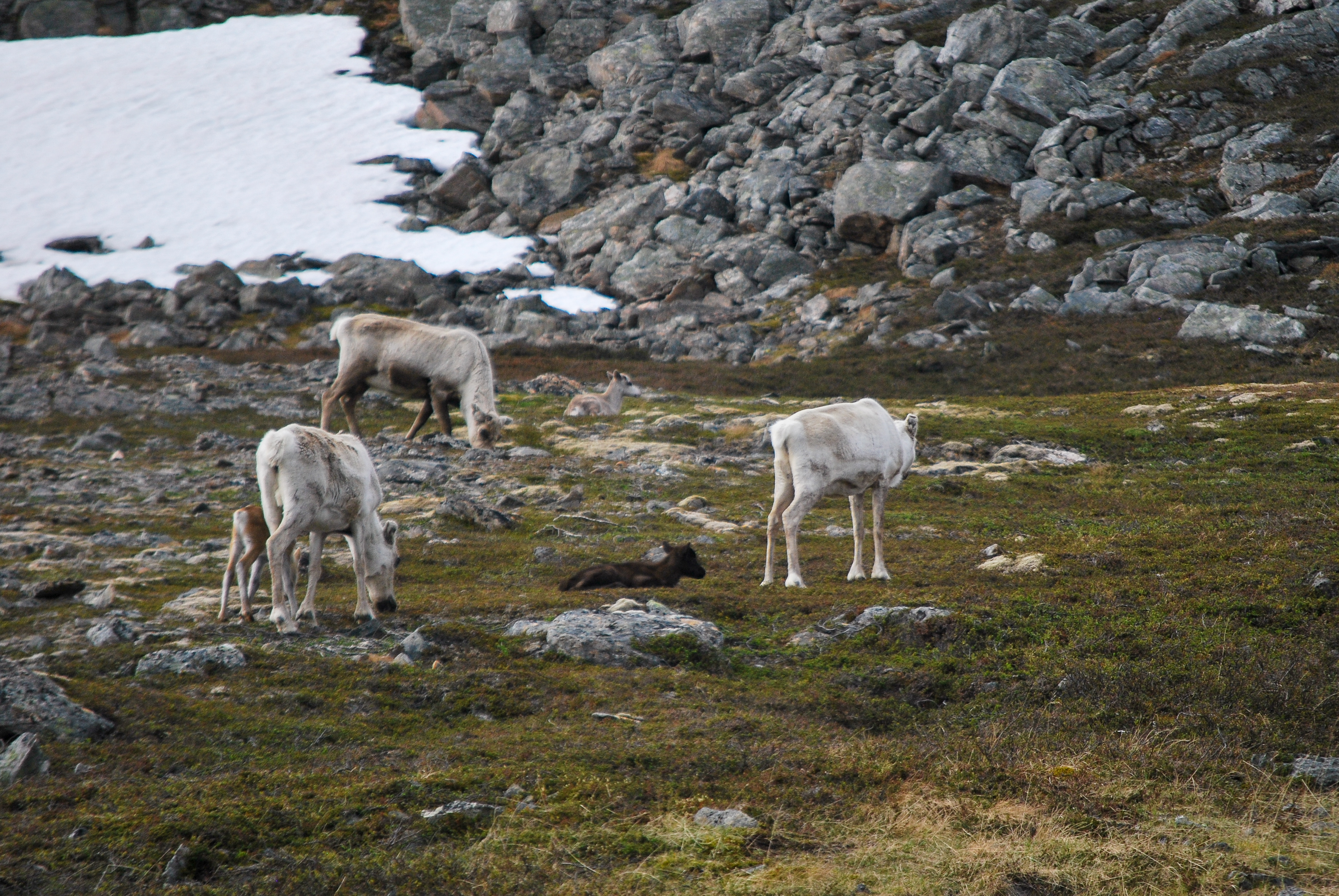
Female Svalbard reindeer with calves

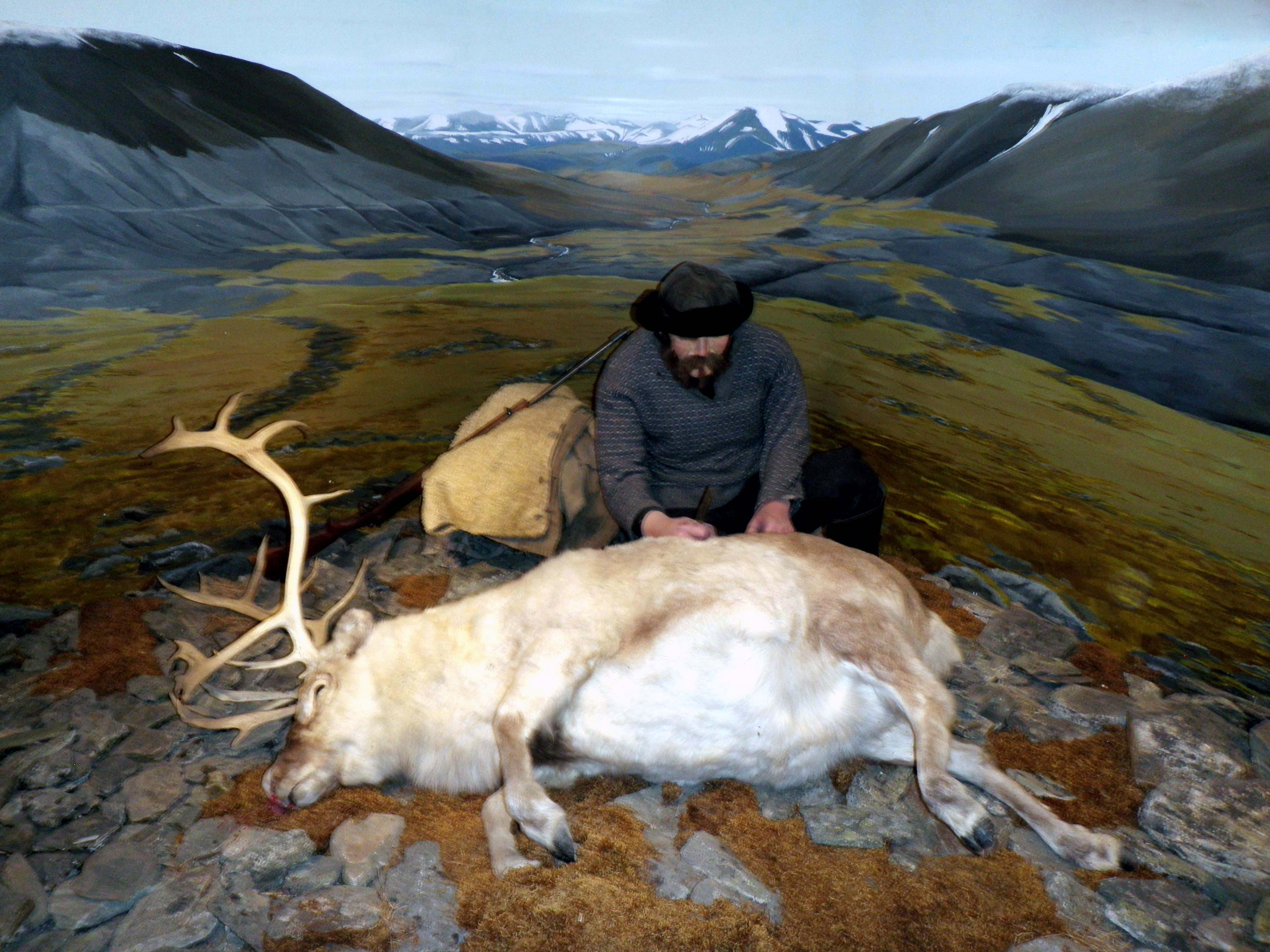
Svalbard reindeer hunting exhibition at the Polar Museum in Tromsø, Norway

Some 200 reindeer were found starved to death in July 2019. Rain on snow early in the winter season formed thick layers of ice on the tundra, making grazing plants inaccessible, a result of the warmer temperatures due to climate change.

== Taxonomy ==
Originally named Cervus (Tarandus) platyrhynchus Vrolik, 1829, the Svalbard reindeer was elevated to species status by Camerano with the name Rangifer spitzbergensis ("spetsbergensis" from Andersén, 1862) and renamed R. platyrhynchus by Miller Jr. (1912). Lydekker (1915) brought it under tundra reindeer as R. tarandus platyrhynchus, but Sokolov (1937) insisted that its morphological differences warranted species status, R. platyrhynchus. Flerov (1933) agreed, illustrating the skull's very different shape, besides being very much smaller than all Russian forms (basal length 295–344 mm [11.6–13.5 in], compared to R. t. sibiricus 346–420 mm [13.6–16.5 in], R. t. phylarchus 390–435 mm [15.4–17.1 in], R. angustirostris 407–430 mm [16.0–16.9 in]). The feet of Svalbard reindeer are also different from Eurasian tundra reindeer, in that the metapodia (long bones of the hand and foot) are shorter in proportion to the tibia.

Despite mtDNA haplotypes that indicate a common origin with mainland tundra reindeer, many genetic studies have shown the wide genetic distance between Svalbard and other reindeer.

Røed, using gel electrophoresis to analyze genetic variation in Svalbard reindeer compared to wild Norwegian reindeer, reported "unique alleles in the loci coding for transferrin and acid phosphatase for the two subspecies indicate that there has been no interbreeding in recent time" and estimated divergence 225,000 years ago, that is, during the interstadial before the last glacial maximum (LGM). One of the hallmarks of species definition is reproductive isolation. Besides the long isolation without interbreeding, despite likely opportunities to do so, Svalbard reindeer have several adaptations specific to their habitat in cold polar desert: they have much lower metabolic rates, whether standing or lying, than other reindeer, and are less energetic in terms of locomotion; they accumulate unusual amounts of fat, their fat metabolism lets them tolerate "lower critical temperatures" of −50 °C (−58 °F), compared to just −30 °C (−22 °F) in wild Norwegian reindeer; and they have adaptations to 24 hours/day darkness in winter, such as attenuated circadian rhythm and melatonin production, that are lacking or reduced in Norwegian reindeer, which enjoy a period of daylight even in midwinter. These adaptations would doubtless preclude a Svalbard reindeer's survival in the habitat of tundra reindeer, and vice versa.

A 2022 study supports the recognition of the Svalbard reindeer as a distinct species, based on heavy genetic divergence and morphological divergence.
