= Fusilier =

Legacy name for certain soldiers

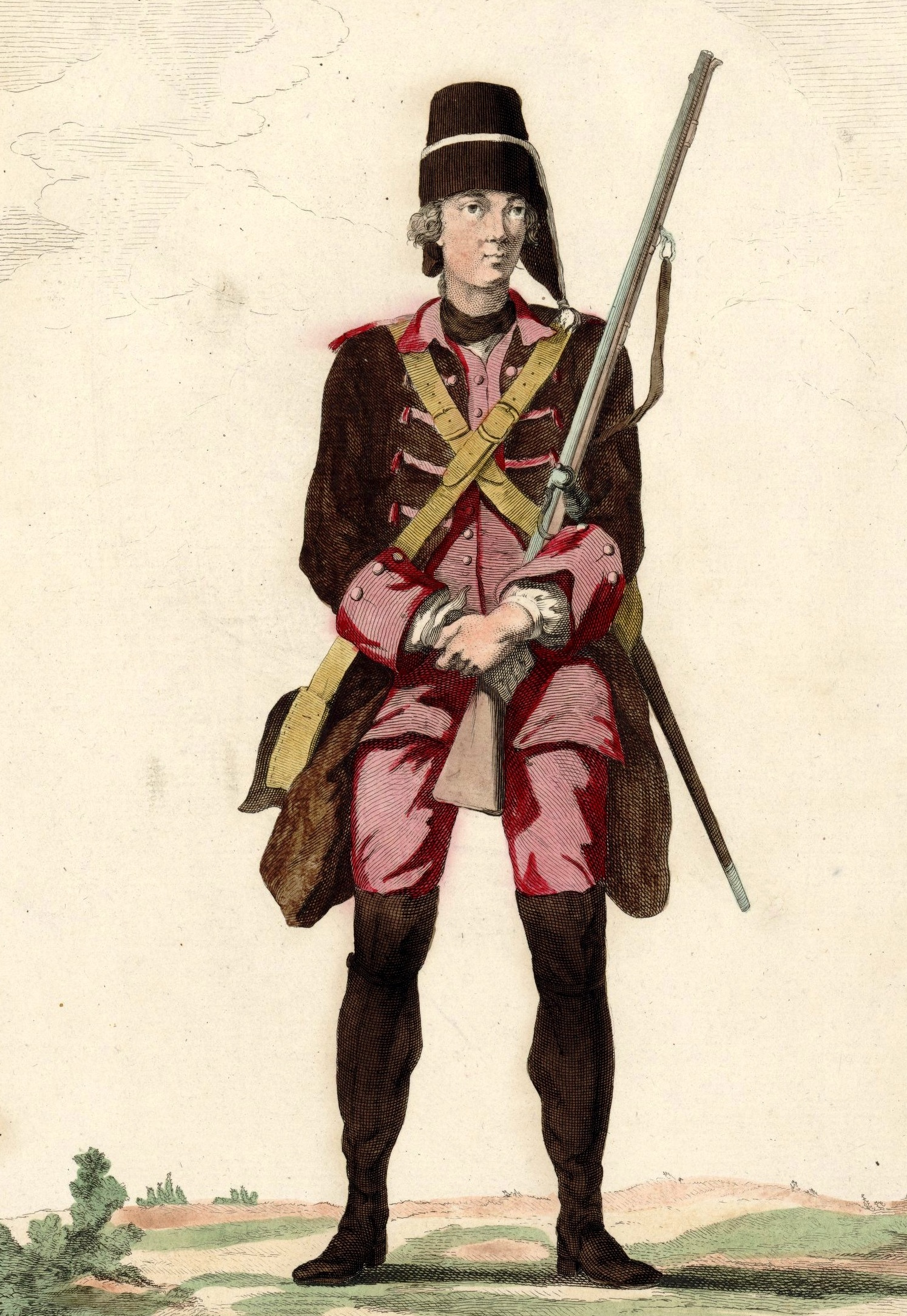
c. 1745–1749 engraving of a French Royal Army fusilier

Fusilier is a name given to various kinds of soldiers; its meaning depends on the historical context. While fusilier is derived from the 17th-century French word fusil – meaning a type of flintlock musket – the term has been used in contrasting ways in different countries and at different times, including soldiers guarding artillery, various elite units, ordinary line infantry and other uses.

== Derivation of the word ==
The word fusil, which was the name of the type of musket carried by a fusilier, is itself derived from the Old French and Latin foisil, meaning a piece of flint.

== History ==
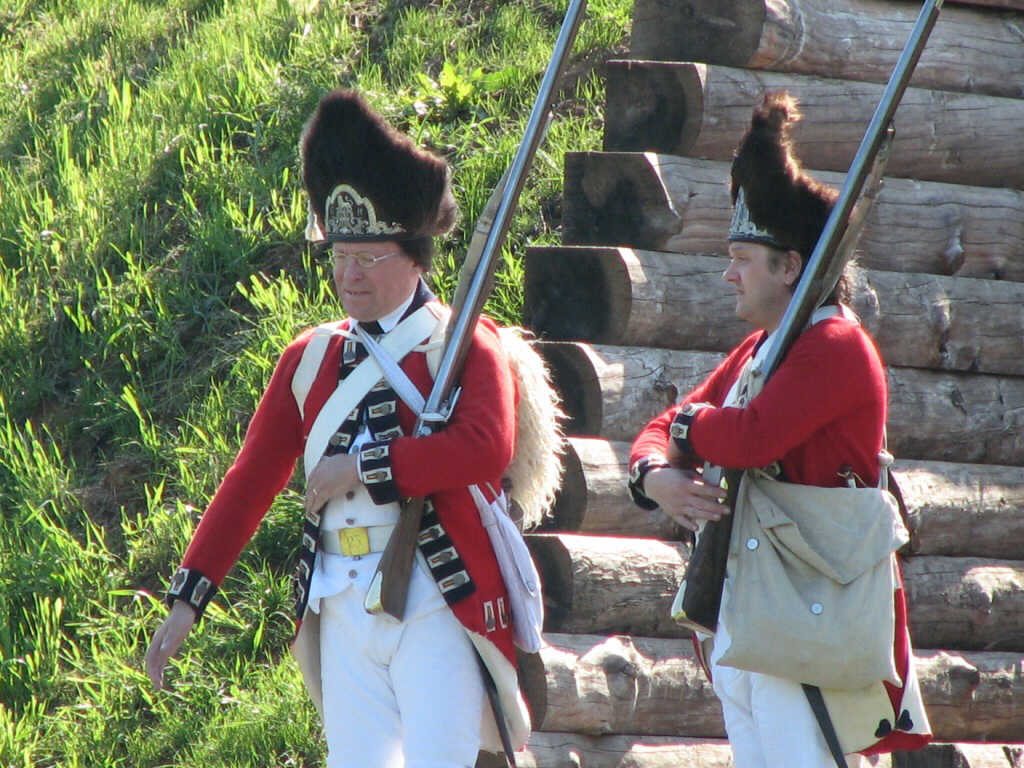
Reenactors in the uniform of the Royal Welch Fusiliers (23rd Regiment of Foot), one of the first British fusilier units

Flintlock small arms were first used militarily during the early 17th century. Flintlocks, at the time, were more reliable and safer to use than matchlock muskets, which required a match to be lit near the breech before the weapon could be triggered. By contrast, flintlocks were fired using a piece of flint. By the time of the English Civil War (1642–1652), one flintlock musket, the snaphance, was in common use in Britain.

The term fusiliers was first used officially by the French Army in 1670, when four fusiliers were distributed among each company of infantry. The following year the Fusiliers du Roi ("King's Fusiliers"), the first regiment composed primarily of soldiers with flintlocks, was formed by Sébastien Le Prestre de Vauban.

Guarding and escorting artillery pieces was the first task assigned to the Fusiliers du Roi: flintlocks were especially useful around field artillery, as they were less likely than matchlocks to accidentally ignite open barrels of gunpowder, required at the time to load cannon. At the time, artillery units also required guards to maintain discipline amongst civilian draymen. Hence the term fusilier became strongly associated with the role of guarding artillery in Britain and the English-speaking world, especially after the formation of the first official "Fusilier" units, during the 1680s. As late as the Seven Years' War of 1756–1763, the Austrian Army maintained an Artillery Fusilier Regiment for the exclusive roles of providing support for field batteries on the battlefield and of protecting the artillery when on the march and in camp.

During the 18th century, as flintlocks became the main weapon used by infantry, the term fusilier gradually ceased to have this meaning and was applied to various units.

== Fusiliers by country ==
=== Belgium ===
The Belgian Army has no specific regiment called fusiliers, but the general denomination for infantry soldiers is storm fusilier (Dutch: stormfuselier; French: fusilier d'assaut).

The Belgian Navy used to have a regiment of marine infantry composed of marine fusiliers in charge of the protection of the naval bases. However this unit was disbanded in the 1990s reforms.

=== Brazil ===
Adopting a number of practices from the Portuguese military in the 19th century, the Brazilian Army uses the term fuzileiros (fusiliers) to designate the regular line infantry, as opposed to the grenadiers (granadeiros) and the light infantry (caçadores and atiradores). In addition, the Brazilian Marine Corps is called Fuzileiros Navais (Naval Fusiliers).

=== Canada ===
There are five fusilier regiments, patterned on the British tradition, in the Canadian Army. The Royal 22nd Regiment, although not fusiliers, wears fusilier ceremonial uniform with scarlet plumes, because of its alliance with the Royal Welch Fusiliers.

The five current Canadian fusilier regiments are:

- The Royal Highland Fusiliers of Canada (which wears Highland uniform, but with white fusilier hackles on balmoral bonnets)
- Les Fusiliers du St-Laurent, white plume
- Les Fusiliers Mont-Royal, white plume
- The Princess Louise Fusiliers (which wear a grey hackle as a token of their alliance with the Royal Inniskilling Fusiliers, now part of the Royal Irish Regiment)
- Les Fusiliers de Sherbrooke, white plume

Former Canadian Army fusilier regiments include the following:

- The Irish Fusiliers of Canada (The Vancouver Regiment) existed in Vancouver, British Columbia, and served in the Canadian Army from 1913 until 1965 when it was reduced to nil strength and placed on the Supplementary Order of Battle. In 2002, it was taken off the Supplementary Order of Battle and amalgamated with the British Columbia Regiment (Duke of Connaught's Own).
- The Canadian Grenadier Guards in Montreal were known as the 1st Regiment "Prince of Wales' Fusiliers" before 1911.
- The Canadian Fusiliers (City of London Regiment) existed in London, Ontario, from 1866 until 1954 when they were amalgamated with The Oxford Rifles and became the London and Oxford Fusiliers (3rd Battalion, The Royal Canadian Regiment) – now the 4th Battalion, The Royal Canadian Regiment.
- The Essex Scottish Regiment of Windsor, Ontario were first known as the Essex Fusiliers from 1887 until 1927. In 1954, they were amalgamated with The Kent Regiment to form The Essex and Kent Scottish.
- The Northern Pioneers when first raised in Parry Sound, Ontario in 1903 were first known as the 23rd Regiment "Northern Fusiliers" until they were renamed a year later. They now form part of The Algonquin Regiment (Northern Pioneers).
- The Saint John Fusiliers existed in Saint John, New Brunswick, from 1872 until 1946 when they were amalgamated with The New Brunswick Rangers to become The New Brunswick Scottish. They now form part of The Royal New Brunswick Regiment.
- The 88th Regiment (Victoria Fusiliers) existed in Victoria, British Columbia, from 1912 until 1920 when they amalgamated with the 50th Regiment (Gordon Highlanders of Canada) to become The Canadian Scottish Regiment (Princess Mary's).
- The 105th Regiment (Saskatoon Fusiliers) existed in Saskatoon from 1912 until 1920 when they were amalgamated with the 52nd Regiment Prince Albert Volunteers to form The North Saskatchewan Regiment (1920–1924). In 1924, The North Saskatchewan Regiment was later reorganised into four separate regiments: The Yorkton Regiment (now the 64th Field Battery, RCA), The Saskatoon Light Infantry, The Prince Albert Volunteers and The Battleford Light Infantry. They now form part of The North Saskatchewan Regiment.
- The Scots Fusiliers of Canada existed in Kitchener, Ontario, from 1914 until 1965 when they amalgamated with the Highland Light Infantry of Canada to form The Highland Fusiliers of Canada – later renamed as the Royal Highland Fusiliers of Canada (see above).

=== France ===
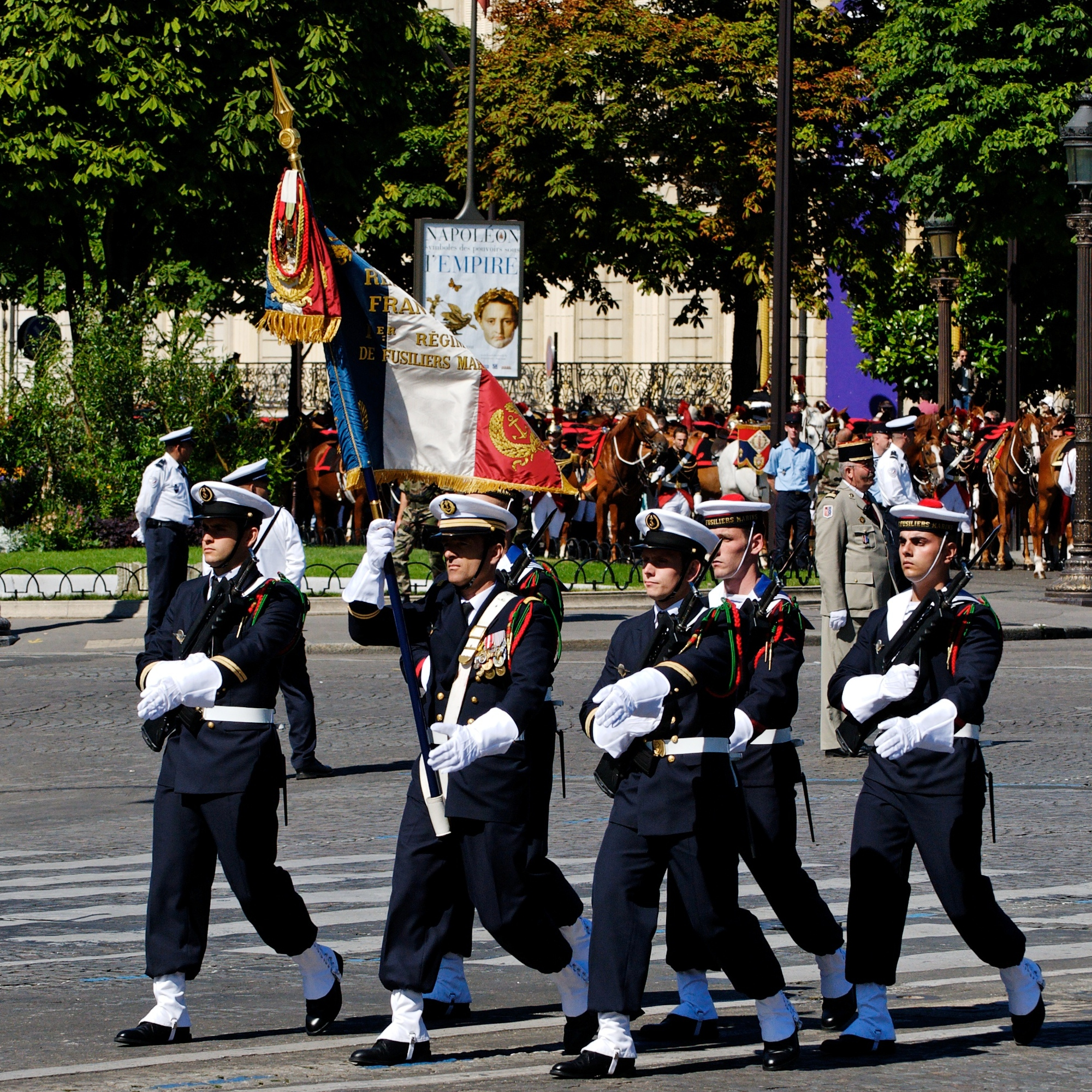
The flag of the 1st Regiment of Naval Fusiliers at the 2008 Bastille Day Military Parade

By the mid-18th century, the French Army used the term fusiliers to designate ordinary line infantry, as opposed to specialist or élite infantry, such as grenadiers, voltigeurs, carabiniers or chasseurs.

The modern French Army no longer uses the term fusiliers, although a number of its infantry regiments descend from fusilier regiments.

The term fusiliers is still used in the navy and air force. They provide protection detachments, performing security and policing duties on land bases and installations as well as on ships. The commandos are selected from their ranks. The commandos are special forces units. They are:

- French Navy: Force maritime des fusiliers marins et commandos (FORFUSCO)
- French Air Force: Fusiliers Commandos de l'Air

=== Germany ===
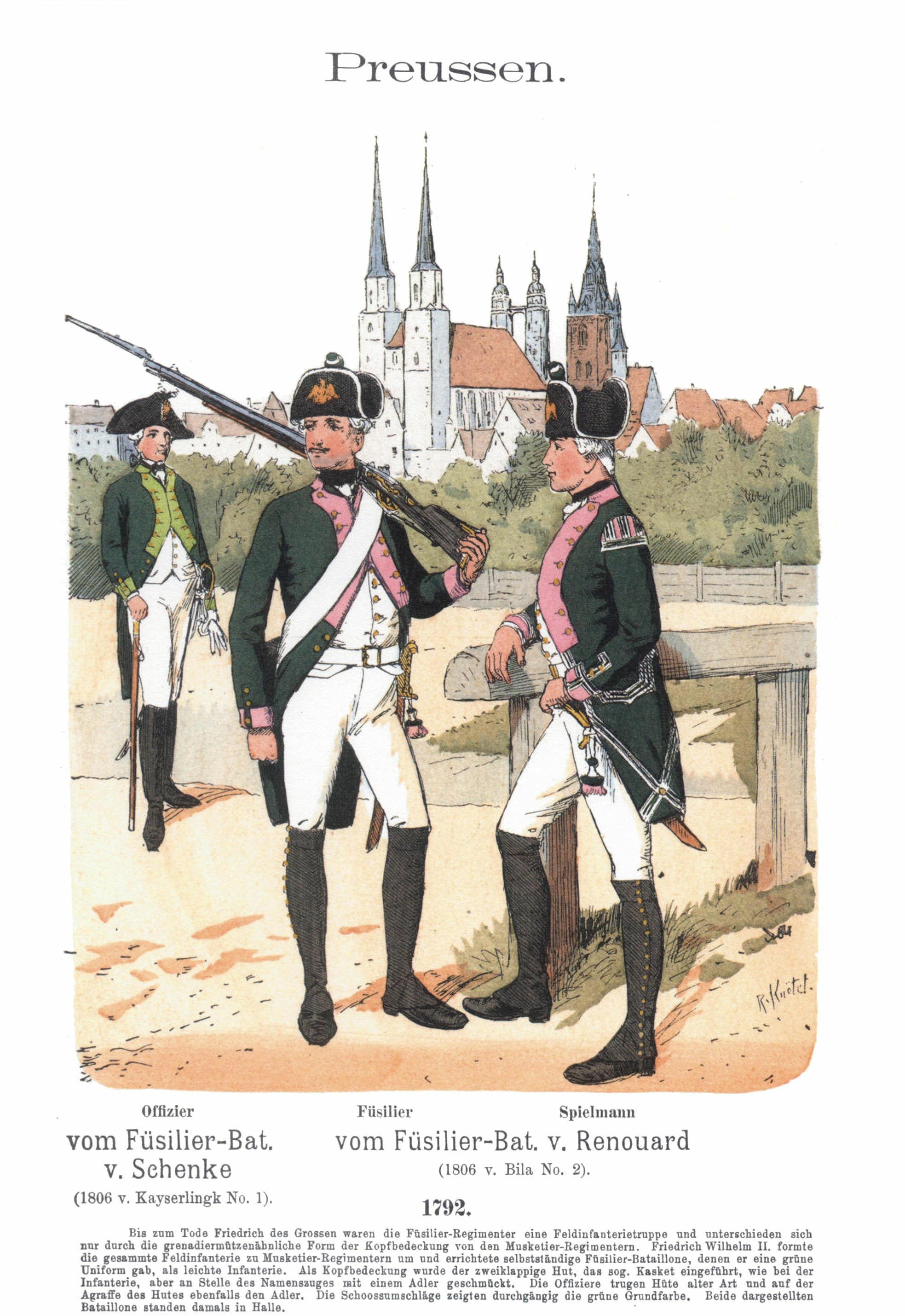
Fusiliers of the Prussian Army in the late 18th century

Prussia made early use of the title Füsilier for various types of infantry. In 1705, the foot guards (Leibgarde zu Fuß) were designated as fusilier guards. By 1737, low-quality infantry raised from garrison companies also were named fusiliers. These latter units were dressed in blue with low mitre caps. Between 1740 and 1743 Frederick the Great raised 14 separate fusilier regiments (numbers 33–40, 41–43 and 45–48). Except for the mitre caps, these new regiments were identical in appearance, training and role to the existing line infantry (musketeers).

Subsequently, Prussia and several other German states used the designation Füsilier to denote a type of light infantry, usually dressed in green and acting as skirmishers. In the Prussian Army, they had been formed in 1787 as independent battalions, with many of the officers having had experience in the American Revolutionary War. The Prussian reforms of 1808 absorbed the fusiliers into the third battalion of each line infantry regiment. Now wearing the same Prussian blue uniforms as standard musketeers, they were distinguished by black leather belts, and a slightly different arrangement of cartridge pouches.

In the Prussian Army of 1870, Infantry Regiments 33 to 40 plus Regiments 73 (Hanover), 80 (Hesse-Kassel) and 86 (Schleswig-Holstein) were all designated as fusiliers, as was the Guard Fusilier Regiment. In addition, the third battalions of all guard, grenadier and line infantry regiments retained the designation fusilier battalion. They were armed with a slightly shorter version of the Dreyse rifle (Füsiliergewehr), that took a sword bayonet (Füsilier-Seitengewehr) rather than the standard socket bayonet. Although still theoretically skirmishers, in practice they differed little from their compatriots, as all Prussian infantry fought in a style that formed a dense 'firing' or 'skirmish' line.

By the 1880s, the title was honorific and, while implying 'specialist' or 'elite', did not have any tactical significance. In a sense, all infantry were becoming fusiliers, as weapons, tactics and equipment took on the fusilier characteristics, that is: skirmish line, shorter rifles, sword bayonets, black leather equipment, and the use of bugles (rather than drums) to relay commands. Nonetheless, these titular units remained in existence until the end of the German Imperial Army in 1918, as follows:

- Guard Fusilier Regiment
- Fusilier Regiment Count Roon (East Prussian) No. 33
- Fusilier Regiment Queen Victoria of Sweden (Pomeranian) No. 34
- Fusilier Regiment Prince Henry of Prussia (Brandenburg) No. 35
- Fusilier Regiment General Field Marshal Count Blumenthal (Magdeburg) No. 36
- Fusilier Regiment von Steinmetz (West Prussian) No. 37
- Fusilier Regiment Field Marshal Count Moltke (Silesian) No. 38
- Lower Rhineland Fusilier Regiment No. 39
- Fusilier Regiment Prince Charles Anton of Hohenzollern No. 40
- Fusilier Regiment Field Marshal Prince Albert of Prussia (Hanoverian) No. 73
- Fusilier Regiment von Gerdsdorff (Electoral Hessian) No. 80
- Fusilier Regiment Queen (Schleswig-Holstein) No. 86
- Grand-Ducal Mecklenburg Fusilier Regiment No. 90
- Fusilier Regiment Emperor Francis Joseph of Austria King of Hungary (4th Royal) Württemberg No. 122

In addition, there was the following regiment:

- Royal Saxon Schützen (Fusilier) Regiment Prince George No. 108

This was a special case, as it was also classed as Schützen (sharpshooter): this designation originally signified a type of Jäger (rifleman, literally 'hunter'), and thus the regiment wore the Jäger-style dark green uniform.

The various fusilier regiments and battalions in the German Imperial Army of 1914 did not have any distinctive dress or equipment to distinguish them as fusiliers. Individual regiments did, however, have special features worn with the dark blue full dress. Some of these features were maintained on the field grey dress of the trenches right up to 1918. As examples in full dress, the Guard Fusiliers had nickel buttons and yellow shoulder straps, and the 80th Fusiliers special braiding on collars and cuffs (deriving from their origin as the Elector of Hesse's Guards). When a regiment was permitted the distinction of a horse-hair plume on the pickelhaube, for fusiliers it was always black. This included the third (fusilier) battalion of those regiments normally distinguished by a white horse-hair plume.

In World War II, the elite Panzer-Grenadier-Division Großdeutschland contained a regiment honorifically titled Panzerfüsiliere ('Armoured Fusiliers'), organised identically to its sister Panzergrenadier regiment within the division. Later in the war, a number of infantry divisions had a fusilier battalion or regiment attached to them, which was to act as a bicycle-mounted reconnaissance or reserve, but were otherwise equipped and used largely the same as regular infantry. Currently, the Bundeswehr has no units bearing the 'fusilier' title.

=== Mexico ===
On 1 January 1969, the Mexican Army created the Parachute Fusilier Brigade (Brigada de Fusileros Paracaidistas) with two infantry battalions and a training battalion. The brigade's role is that of a strategic reserve, based in Mexico City.

=== Netherlands ===
In the Royal Netherlands Army, one of the two foot guards regiments, the Garderegiment Fuseliers Prinses Irene, is a regiment of fusiliers.

=== Portugal ===
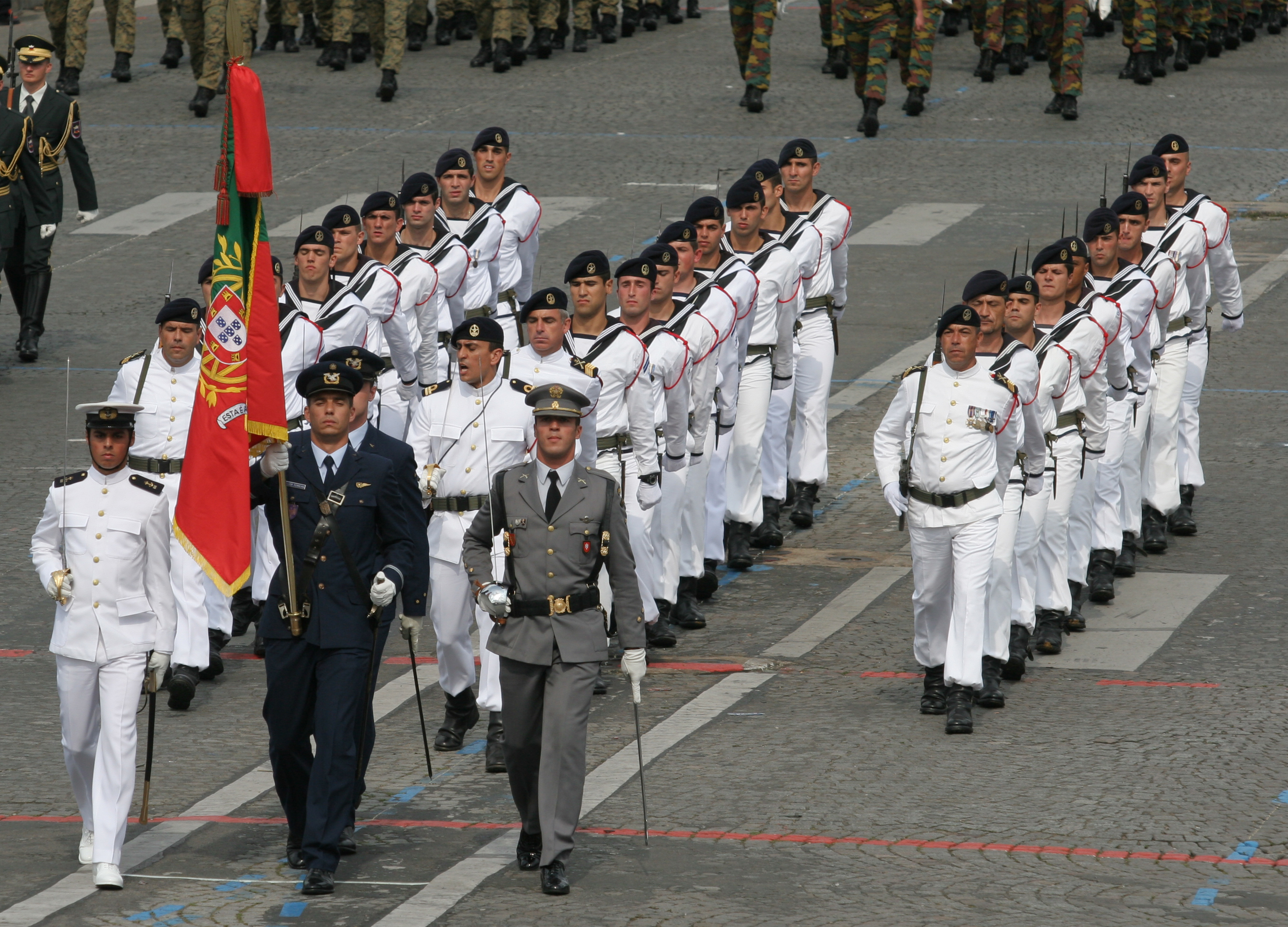
Portuguese Navy Fusiliers on parade

From the 18th to the 19th centuries, the term fuzileiros (fusiliers) was used in the Portuguese Army, to designate the regular line infantry, as opposed to the grenadiers (granadeiros) and the light infantry (caçadores and atiradores). The Portuguese Army discontinued the use of the term in the 1860s.

The term fuzileiros marinheiros (fusilier sailors) has been used in the Portuguese Navy, since the late 18th century, to designate the naval infantry. The modern Portuguese Marine Corps is called Fuzileiros Navais (Naval Fusiliers).

=== Switzerland ===
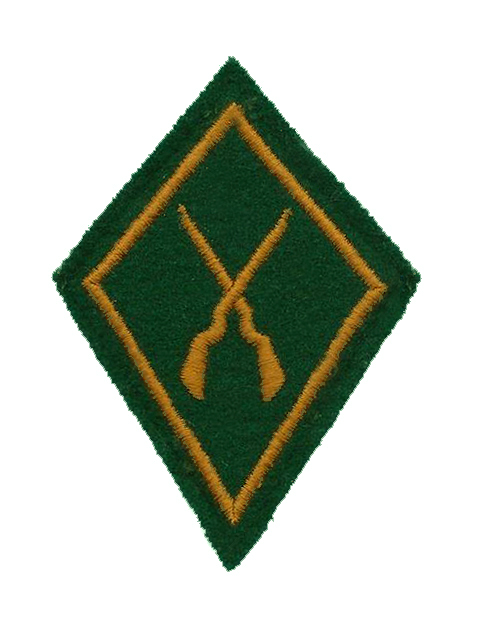
Gorget patch of Swiss Füsilier

Line infantry soldiers of the lowest rank in the Swiss Army have historically been designated as fusiliers. Because the modern Swiss infantry soldier is trained in a much broader variety of tasks than his earlier counterpart, and because of some supposedly negative connotations attached to the term Füsiliere, modern infantry battalions of the Swiss army have been renamed Infanteriebataillone or "Inf Bat". The individual soldiers are officially called Infanteristen, not Füsiliere, but colloquially they are still referred to as Füsiliere or Füsle. This meaning is retained in the name of the 1938 Swiss film Fusilier Wipf.

=== United Kingdom ===
The original fusiliers in the British Army were the 7th Foot, Royal Regiment of Fuzileers raised in 1685. This subsequently became The Royal Fusiliers (City of London Regiment). The original purpose of this unit was to act as escort to artillery guns, as well as keeping discipline amongst the civilian drivers. Both Scots (21st Foot) and Welsh (23rd Foot) regiments also became fusiliers in the period up to and including 1702 and all three regiments were distinguished by the wearing of a slightly shorter version of the mitred cap worn by grenadier companies of all other infantry regiments. A number of additional infantry regiments were subsequently designated as fusiliers during the 19th century, but this was simply a historic distinction without any relationship to special weapons or roles.

In 1865, a distinctive head-dress was authorised for British Army fusilier regiments. Originally a sealskin cap for other ranks, this was replaced by a black raccoon skin cap of 9 inches (23 cm) in height, according to the 1874 Dress Regulations. However, fusilier officers wore a taller bearskin like their counterparts in the foot guards. The badge for each regiment was placed at the front of the bear or raccoon skin headdress, and consisted of a stylized flaming grenade, with different emblems placed on the ball of the grenade. These continue to be worn to the present day by the band of the Royal Regiment of Fusiliers, and also by colour parties, pioneers and drum majors in the Royal Welsh.

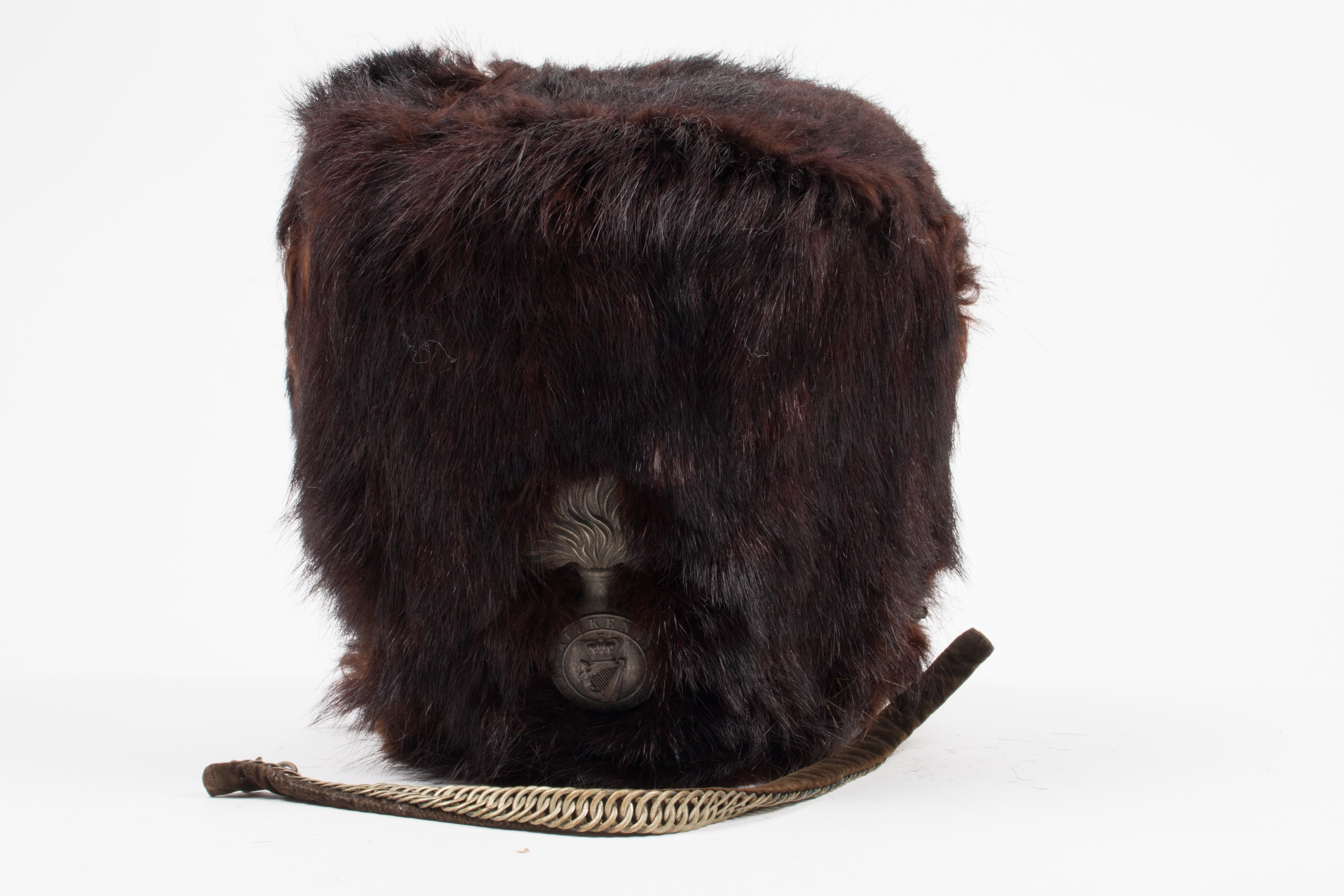
An example of an officer's bearskin cap worn by an Irish fusilier regiment, c. 1878.

Attached to the various types of fusilier headdress, including the modern beret, is the hackle. This is a short cut feather plume, the colours of which vary according to the regiment. Initially, the only regiment authorised to wear a plume or hackle were the 5th of Foot (Northumberland Fusiliers). The regiment had originally worn a white feather distinction, authorised in 1824 to commemorate the victory of St Lucia in 1778 when men of the Fifth Regiment were supposed to have taken white feathers from the hats of dead French soldiers. When, in 1829, a white plume was ordered for all line infantry regiments, to preserve the Fifth (Northumberland) Regiment's emblem, they were authorised to wear a white plume with a red tip, allegedly to indicate a distinction won in battle. The Fifth were designated fusiliers in 1836.

Following the Second Boer War, plumes were added to the headgear of all fusilier regiments in recognition of their service in South Africa.

The following fusilier regiments existed prior to the outbreak of World War I:

Regiment	Pre-1881 title	Year of designation as fusiliers	Badge (on flaming grenade)	Plume or hackle
Northumberland Fusiliers	5th (Northumberland Fusiliers) Regiment of Foot	1836	Within a circlet inscribed Quo Fata Vocant St George and the Dragon	Red over white (1829)
Royal Fusiliers (City of London Regiment)	7th (Royal Fusiliers) Regiment of Foot	On raising in 1685	The Garter surmounted by a crown; within the Garter a rose; below the Garter the White Horse of Hanover	White (1901)
Lancashire Fusiliers	20th (East Devonshire) Regiment of Foot	1881	The sphinx superscribed Egypt within a laurel wreath	Primrose yellow (1901). The 20th Foot wore yellow facings until 1881.
Royal Scots Fusiliers	21st (Royal Scots Fusiliers) Regiment of Foot	Between 1686 and 1691 (exact date unknown)	The royal arms	White (1902)
Royal Welsh Fusiliers	23rd (Royal Welch Fusiliers) Regiment of Foot	1702	The Prince of Wales's plumes, coronet and motto (Ich dien)	White
Royal Inniskilling Fusiliers	108th (Madras Infantry) Regiment of Foot	1881	The Castle of Inniskilling	Grey (1903). The colour commemorated the original uniform of the "Grey Inniskillings" of 1689.
Royal Irish Fusiliers (Princess Victoria's)	89th (Princess Victoria's) Regiment of Foot	1827 (87th Foot)	A French Imperial Eagle upon a plinth inscribed "8" within a laurel wreath	Emerald green
Royal Munster Fusiliers	104th (Bengal Fusiliers) Regiment of Foot	1850 (104th as 2nd Bengal European Fusiliers)	The arms of the Province of Munster within a laurel wreath bearing 10 battle honours. A scroll at the base inscribed Royal Munster.	White over green
Royal Dublin Fusiliers	103rd (Royal Bombay Fusilers) Regiment of Foot	1844: 103rd as 1st Bombay (European) Fusiliers	The arms of the City of Dublin within a wreath of shamrock, at the base an elephant on a tablet inscribed Mysore and a tiger on a tablet inscribed Plassey, all over a scroll inscribed Spectamur Agendo.	Blue over green

The nine regiments of fusiliers that existed in 1914 have since been reduced to one by a series of disbandments and mergers:

- In 1920, the Royal Welsh Fusiliers was renamed as the "Royal Welch Fusiliers".
- Due to the creation of the Irish Free State, the Royal Munster Fusiliers and Royal Dublin Fusiliers were disbanded on 31 July 1922.
- In 1935, the Northumberland Fusiliers was awarded the title "Royal".
- Under the Defence Review of 1957, the number of infantry regiments was reduced. The Royal Scots Fusiliers was amalgamated with the Highland Light Infantry on 20 January 1959 to form the Royal Highland Fusiliers. The new regiment wore the white hackle of the RSF, with a flaming grenade badge bearing the monogram of the HLI.
- Under the same review, the three English fusilier regiments were grouped as the Fusilier Brigade in 1958. While retaining their individual identities, a single cap badge was adopted. This was flaming grenade bearing St George and the Dragon within a laurel wreath the whole ensigned by a crown. This combined elements of the badges of the three regiments, who continued to be distinguished by their coloured hackles: red over white for the Royal Northumberland Fusiliers, white for the Royal Fusiliers and primrose yellow for the Lancashire Fusiliers.
- Also in 1958 the North Irish Brigade was formed, consisting of the Royal Inniskilling Fusiliers, the Royal Irish Fusiliers and the Royal Ulster Rifles. All regiments adopted a harp and crown badge on the caubeen, worn with a hackle: grey for the Inniskillings, green for the Royal Irish Fusiliers and black for the Rifles.
- On 1 May 1963, the Royal Warwickshire Regiment was redesignated as the Royal Warwickshire Fusiliers and joined the Fusilier Brigade. An old gold and blue hackle was adopted.
- On 23 April 1968 (St George's Day), the four regiments of the Fusilier Brigade were amalgamated to form The Royal Regiment of Fusiliers. The RRF is now the only English fusilier regiment and wear the red over white hackle of the 5th Foot with the badge adopted in 1958 for the Fusilier Brigade.
- On 1 July 1968, the three regiments of the North Irish Brigade were amalgamated to form the Royal Irish Rangers and ceased to be a fusilier regiment. The green hackle of the Royal Irish Fusiliers continued in use. Following a further merger in 1992, the lineage is now continued by the Royal Irish Regiment.
- On 1 March 2006 (St David's Day), the Royal Welch Fusiliers was amalgamated with the Royal Regiment of Wales to form the Royal Welsh. The white hackle of the RWF is worn with the cap badge of the RRW. Elements of the regimental band wear fusilier full dress.
- On 28 March 2006, the Scottish infantry regiments were merged into the Royal Regiment of Scotland. The individual battalions of the regiment retain the titles of the predecessor units, and The Royal Highland Fusiliers, 2nd Battalion The Royal Regiment of Scotland continues to wear the white hackle of the Royal Scots Fusiliers.

In addition, the Scots Guards were known as the Scots Fusilier Guards from 1831 to 1877.

== See also ==
- Musketeer
- Rifleman
- Grenadier
