= North Saskatchewan Regiment (1920–1924) =

The North Saskatchewan Regiment
- Active: 1920–1924
- Country: Canada
- Branch: Canadian Militia
- Type: Line infantry
- Role: Infantry
- Size: 8 battalions
- Part of: Non-Permanent Active Militia
- Garrison/HQ: Saskatoon, Saskatchewan
- Engagements: First World War

The North Saskatchewan Regiment was a short-lived infantry regiment of the Non-Permanent Active Militia of the Canadian Militia (now the Canadian Army). In 1924, the regiment was reorganized and split up into 4 separate regiments.

== Lineage ==
=== 105th Regiment (Saskatoon Fusiliers) ===
- Originated on 1 April 1912, in Saskatoon, Saskatchewan, as the 105th Regiment.
- Redesignated on 16 September 1912, as the 105th Regiment Fusiliers.
- Redesignated on 15 April 1914, as the 105th Regiment (Saskatoon Fusiliers).
- Amalgamated on 15 March 1920, with the 52nd Regiment Prince Albert Volunteers and redesignated as The North Saskatchewan Regiment.

=== 52nd Regiment Prince Albert Volunteers ===
- Originated on 2 January 1913, in Prince Albert, Saskatchewan, as an infantry regiment consisting of 8 companies.
- Designated on 1 February 1913, as the 52nd Regiment Prince Albert Volunteers.
- Amalgamated on 15 March 1920, with the 105th Regiment (Saskatoon Fusiliers) and redesignated as The North Saskatchewan Regiment.

== Perpetuations ==
- 5th Battalion (Western Cavalry), CEF
- 53rd Battalion (Northern Saskatchewan), CEF
- 65th Battalion (Saskatchewan), CEF
- 96th Battalion (Canadian Highlanders), CEF
- 188th (Saskatchewan) Battalion, CEF
- 232nd (Saskatchewan) Battalion, CEF

== History ==
=== 52nd Regiment Prince Albert Volunteers ===
On 2 January 1913, the 52nd Regiment Prince Albert Volunteers were authorized with its Headquarters at Prince Albert, Saskatchewan.

=== 105th Regiment (Saskatoon Fusiliers) ===
On 1 April 1912, the 105th Regiment was authorized for service with its Headquarters at Saskatoon.

On 16 September 1912, the regiment was Redesignated as the 105th Regiment Fusiliers and again on 15 April 1914, as the 105th Regiment (Saskatoon Fusiliers).

=== The Great War ===
On 6 August 1914, Details from both the 52nd Regiment Prince Albert Volunteers and the 105th Regiment (Saskatoon Fusiliers) were placed on active service for local protection duties.

On 10 August 1914, the 5th Battalion (Western Cavalry), CEF was authorized for service and on 29 September 1915, the battalion embarked for Great Britain. On 14 February 1915, the 5th Battalion disembarked in France where it fought as part of the 2nd Canadian Brigade, 1st Canadian Division in France and Flanders until the end of the war. On 15 September 1920, the 5th Battalion, CEF was disbanded.

On 7 November 1914, the 53rd Battalion (Northern Saskatchewan), CEF was authorized for service and on 29 March 1916, the battalion embarked for Great Britain. After its arrival in the UK, the battalion provided reinforcements for the Canadian Corps in the field. On 12 October 1917, the 53rd Battalion, CEF was disbanded.

On 20 April 1915, the 65th Battalion (Saskatchewan), CEF was authorized for service and on 18 June 1916, the battalion embarked for Great Britain. After its arrival in the UK, on 30 June 1916, the battalion’s personnel were absorbed by various units of the 4th Canadian Division. On 12 October 1917, the 65th Battalion, CEF was disbanded.

On 15 July 1916, the 232nd (Saskatchewan) Battalion, CEF was authorized for service and on 18 April 1917, the battalion embarked for Great Britain. After its arrival in the UK, from 29 April to 9 June 1917, the battalion’s personnel were absorbed by the 15th Reserve Battalion, CEF to provide reinforcements for the Canadian Corps in the field. On 12 October 1917, the 232nd Battalion, CEF was disbanded.

=== The North Saskatchewan Regiment ===
On 1 October 1920, as a result of the Otter Commission and the following reorganization of the Canadian Militia, The North Saskatchewan Regiment was formed by the amalgamation of the 105th Regiment (Saskatoon Fusiliers) and the 52nd Regiment Prince Albert Volunteers.

This amalgamation was short-lived, however, as on 15 May 1924, The North Saskatchewan Regiment was split up and reorganized into 4 separate regiments: The Yorkton Regiment (now the 64th Field Battery, RCA), The Saskatoon Regiment, The Prince Albert Volunteers and The Battleford Light Infantry.

== Organization ==
=== The North Saskatchewan Regiment (21 April 1921) ===
- Regimental Headquarters (Saskatoon)
- 1st Battalion (Saskatoon - formed by redesignation of 105th Regiment (Saskatoon Fusiliers)) (perpetuating the 5th Battalion, CEF)
- 2nd Battalion (Prince Albert - formed by redesignation of 52nd Regiment Prince Albert Volunteers) (perpetuating the 53rd Battalion, CEF)
- 3rd Battalion (Yorkton)
- 4th Battalion (North Battleford) (perpetuating the 232nd Battalion, CEF)
- 5th (Reserve) Battalion (perpetuating the 65th Battalion, CEF)
- 6th (Reserve) Battalion (perpetuating the 96th Battalion, CEF)
- 7th (Reserve) Battalion (perpetuating the 188th Battalion, CEF)
- 8th (Reserve) Battalion
