= North Saskatchewan Regiment =

The North Saskatchewan Regiment
- Badge of the North Saskatchewan Regiment.
- Active: 3 July 1905–present
- Country: Canada
- Branch: Canadian Army
- Type: Line infantry
- Size: One infantry battalion and one pipe and drum band
- Part of: 38 Canadian Brigade Group
- Garrison/HQ: Saskatoon and Prince Albert, Saskatchewan
- Motto: Cede nullis (Latin for 'Yield to none')
- March: "The Jockey of York"
- Engagements: North-West Rebellion; First World War; Second World War; War in Afghanistan
- Battle honours: See #Battle honours
- Website: canada.ca/en/army/corporate/3-canadian-division/the-north-saskatchewan-regiment.html

Insignia
- Abbreviation: N Sask R
- Tartan: MacKenzie Hunting (pipes and drums only)

The North Saskatchewan Regiment (N Sask R) is a Primary Reserve infantry regiment of the Canadian Army, headquartered in Saskatoon, Saskatchewan, with companies in Saskatoon and Prince Albert. Its current commanding officer is Lieutenant-Colonel Mike Graver, and the Regimental Sergeant-Major is Chief Warrant Officer Rick Cumbers. The N Sask R is part of 38 Canadian Brigade Group, with the regiment's mission task as of 2024 being to provide direct fire support.

The regiment incorporates the heritage of units that fought in the suppression of the North-West Rebellion (Prince Albert Volunteers, Moose Mountain Scouts and Battleford Infantry), the First World War (1st Battalion Canadian Mounted Rifles, 5th Battalion (Western Cavalry), CEF, and 53rd Battalion, CEF) and the Second World War (1st Battalion Saskatoon Light Infantry).

== Perpetuations ==
=== North-West Rebellion perpetuations ===
- The Moose Mountain Scouts
- The Infantry Company, Battleford, Saskatchewan

=== Great War perpetuations ===
- The Canadian Light Horse
- 1st Battalion, Canadian Mounted Rifles, CEF
- 9th Regiment, Canadian Mounted Rifles, CEF
- 10th Regiment, Canadian Mounted Rifles, CEF
- 5th Battalion (Western Cavalry), CEF
- 53rd Battalion (Northern Saskatchewan), CEF
- 65th Battalion (Saskatchewan), CEF
- 232nd Battalion (Saskatchewan), CEF

== Operational history ==
=== North-West Rebellion ===
The Moose Mountain Scouts were raised for active service on 24 April 1885 and served with the Line of Communication Troops of the North West Field Force until disbanded on 18 September 1885.

The Infantry Company at Battleford was raised for active service on 10 April 1885, and served with the Battleford Column of the North-West Field Force. It was disbanded on 18 September 1885.

=== Great War ===
The distinguishing patch of the 1st Battalion, Canadian Mounted Rifles, CEF.

The 1st Battalion, Canadian Mounted Rifles, CEF was authorized on 7 November 1914 and embarked for Great Britain on 12 June 1915. It disembarked in France on 22 September 1915, where it fought as part of the 1st Brigade, Canadian Mounted Rifles, until 1 January 1916. The battalion was converted to infantry, and allocated to the 8th Infantry Brigade, 3rd Canadian Division. The battalion fought in France and Flanders until the end of the Great War.

The 9th Regiment, Canadian Mounted Rifles was authorized on 7 November 1914 and embarked for Great Britain on 23 November 1915. There, its personnel were absorbed by the Canadian Cavalry Reserve Depot, CEF, the 1st Battalion, Canadian Mounted Rifles, CEF and the 5th Battalion, Canadian Mounted Rifles, CEF on 31 January 1916. The regiment disbanded on 15 November 1920.

The 10th Regiment, Canadian Mounted Rifles was authorized on 7 November 1914 and embarked for Great Britain on 28 April 1916. Its personnel were absorbed by the Canadian Cavalry Reserve Depot, CEF on 22 May 1916. The regiment was disbanded on 17 July 1917.

The distinguishing patch of the 5th Battalion (Western Cavalry), CEF.

The 5th Battalion (Western Cavalry), CEF, was authorized on 10 August 1914 and embarked for Great Britain on 29 September 1915. It disembarked in France on 14 February 1915, where it fought as part of the 2nd Infantry Brigade, 1st Canadian Division in France and Flanders until the end of the war. The battalion disbanded on 15 September 1920.

The 53rd Battalion (Northern Saskatchewan), CEF was authorized on 7 November 1914 and embarked for Great Britain on 29 March 1916. It provided reinforcements for the Canadian Corps until it disbanded on 12 October 1917.

The 65th Battalion (Saskatchewan), CEF was authorized on 20 April 1915 and embarked for Great Britain on 18 June 1916. Its personnel were absorbed by various units of the 4th Canadian Division on 30 June 1916. The battalion was disbanded on 12 October 1917.

The 232nd (Saskatchewan) Battalion, CEF was authorized on 15 July 1916 and embarked for Great Britain on 18 April 1917. Its personnel were absorbed by the 15th Reserve Battalion, CEF on 29 April and 9 June 1917 to provide reinforcements for the Canadian Corps. The battalion was disbanded on 12 October 1917.

=== Second World War ===
The camp flag of the North Saskatchewan Regiment.

Details of The Prince Albert and Battleford Volunteers and The Saskatoon Light Infantry (Machine Gun) were called out on service on 26 August 1939 and then placed on active service on 1 September 1939 for local protection duties. These details were disbanded on 31 December 1940.

The 16th/22nd Saskatchewan Horse mobilized for active service on 24 May 1940. It was redesignated as the 20th Reconnaissance Battalion (16/22 Saskatchewan Horse), CAC, CASF, on 26 January 1942 and the 20th Army Tank Regiment (16/22 Saskatchewan Horse), CAC, CASF, on 15 May 1942. On 16 June 1943 it embarked for Great Britain, where it was disbanded on 1 November 1943.

The 1st Battalion, The Prince Albert Volunteers, CASF, mobilized on 5 March 1942. It served in Canada in a home defence role as part of the 15th Infantry Brigade, 7th Canadian Infantry Division and 19th Infantry Brigade, Pacific Command, and disbanded on 30 November 1945.

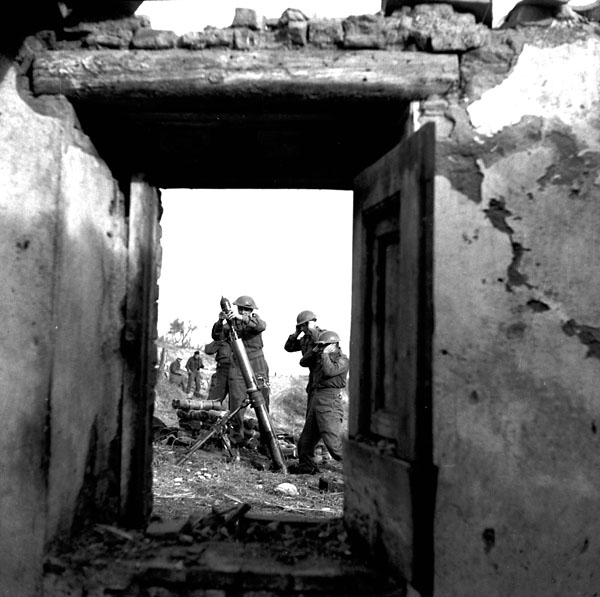
Personnel of the Saskatoon Light Infantry firing a 3-inch mortar, near Ortona, Italy, January 5, 1944

The Saskatoon Light Infantry (Machine Gun), CASF, mobilized for active service on 1 September 1939. It was redesignated as the 1st Battalion, The Saskatoon Light Infantry (Machine Gun), CASF, on 7 November 1940, then as the 1st Infantry Division Support Battalion (The Saskatoon Light Infantry), CIC, CASF, on 1 May 1943 and finally as the 1st Battalion, The Saskatoon Light Infantry (Machine Gun), CASF, on 1 July 1944. The battalion embarked for Great Britain on 8 December 1939. It participated in the expedition to raid the Norwegian island of Spitzbergen on 25 August 1941, landed in Sicily on 10 July and Italy on 3 September 1943 as part of the 1st Canadian Infantry Division. The unit landed in France on 4 March 1945, on its way to the North-West Europe theatre of operations in which it served until the end of the war. The overseas battalion was disbanded on 15 October 1945. On 1 June 1945 The Saskatoon Light Infantry (Machine Gun) mobilized three cannon companies for active service with the Canadian Army Pacific Force, which disbanded on 1 November 1945.

=== War in Afghanistan ===
The regiment contributed an aggregate of more than 20% of its authorized strength to the various Task Forces which served in Afghanistan between 2002 and 2014.

== Battle honours ==
The regimental colour of the North Saskatchewan Regiment.

Battle honours in small capitals are for large operations and campaigns and those in lowercase are for more specific battles. Bold type indicates honours emblazoned on regimental colours.

North West Rebellion
North West Canada, 1885
First World War
- **Ypres, 1915, '17**
- Gravenstafel
- St. Julien
- Festubert, 1915
- **Mount Sorrel**
- **Somme, 1916**
- Flers–Courcelette
- Thiepval
- Ancre Heights
- **Arras, 1917, '18**
- **Vimy, 1917**
- Arleux
- **Hill 70**
- **Passchendaele**
- **Amiens**
- Scarpe, 1918
- Drocourt–Quéant
- **Hindenburg Line**
- Canal du Nord
- Cambrai, 1918
- Valenciennes
- **France and Flanders, 1915–18**
Second World War
- **Landing in Sicily**
- Valguarnera
- **Agira**
- Adrano
- Sicily, 1943
- **The Gully**
- **Ortona**
- Cassino Ii
- Gustav Line
- **Liri Valley**
- **Hitler Line**
- **Gothic Line**
- **Lamone Crossing**
- **Rimini Line**
- Cesena
- Savio Bridgehead
- Naviglio Canal
- Fosso Vecchio
- Fosso Munio
- Italy, 1943–1945
- **Apeldoorn**
- North-West Europe, 1945
Honorary distinction: The wartime badge of the Regina Rifle Regiment with the year dates "1944–45" in recognition of the role played by the Prince Albert and Battleford Volunteers in the mobilization of the Canadian Active Service Force unit of the Regina Rifle Regiment.
South-West Asia
Afghanistan

Two of the units which were amalgamated to form this regiment, the 16th Canadian Light Horse and The Prince Albert Volunteers, possessed the battle honour Pursuit to Mons from the Great War, but this honour cannot be perpetuated if a regiment is entitled to the honour Valenciennes or Sambre. One of these honours was gained by the regiment upon the amalgamations.

== Lineage ==
=== The North Saskatchewan Regiment ===
- Originated 3 July 1905 in Regina, Saskatchewan on 3 July 1905 as The 16th Mounted Rifles
- Redesignated 1 October 1908 as the 16th Light Horse
- Redesignated 15 March 1920 as the 16th Canadian Light Horse
- Amalgamated 15 December 1936 with The Saskatchewan Mounted Rifles and redesignated as the 16th/22nd Saskatchewan Horse
- Redesignated 7 November 1940 as the 16th/22nd Saskatchewan Horse (Reserve)
- Converted 1 April 1941 to infantry and redesignated as the 2nd (Reserve) Battalion, 16th/22nd Saskatchewan Horse
- Redesignated 1 May 1941 as the 2nd (Reserve) Battalion, The Battleford Light Infantry (16th/22nd Saskatchewan Horse)
- Redesignated 15 September 1944 as The Battleford Light Infantry (16th/22nd Saskatchewan Horse) (Reserve)
- Amalgamated 1 April 1946 with the 2nd (Reserve) Battalion, The Prince Albert Volunteers and redesignated as The Prince Albert and Battleford Volunteers
- Amalgamated 1 September 1954 with the 50th Field Squadron, RCE, and redesignated as The Prince Albert and Battleford Volunteers (Machine Gun)
- Amalgamated 17 February 1955 with The Saskatoon Light Infantry (Machine Gun) and redesignated as The North Saskatchewan Regiment (Machine Gun)
- Redesignated 11 April 1958 as The North Saskatchewan Regiment
- On 1 September 1970, the 1st Battalion, The North Saskatchewan Regiment (The Prince Albert and Battleford Volunteers) and the 2nd Battalion, The North Saskatchewan Regiment (The Saskatoon Light Infantry) were amalgamated.

=== The Saskatchewan Mounted Rifles ===
- Originated 2 March 1908 in Lloydminster, Saskatchewan the Saskatchewan Light Horse
- Redesignated 1 April 1908 as the 22nd Saskatchewan Light Horse
- Redesignated 15 March 1920 as The Saskatchewan Mounted Rifles
- Amalgamated 15 December 1936 with the 16th Canadian Light Horse

=== 50th Field Squadron, RCE ===
- Originated 5 June 1947 in Lloydminster, Saskatchewan
- Amalgamated 1 September 1954 with The Prince Albert and Battleford Volunteers

=== 105th Regiment (Saskatoon Fusiliers) ===
- Originated 1 April 1912 Saskatoon, Saskatchewan as the 105th Regiment
- Redesignated 16 September 1912 as the 105th Regiment Fusiliers
- Redesignated 15 April 1914 as the 105th Regiment (Saskatoon Fusiliers)
- Amalgamated 15 March 1920 with the 52nd Regiment Prince Albert Volunteers and redesignated as The North Saskatchewan Regiment
- Reorganized on 15 May 1924 as four separate regiments: The Yorkton Regiment (now the 64th Field Battery, 10th Field Artillery Regiment, RCA); The Saskatoon Light Infantry; The Battleford Light Infantry and The Prince Albert Volunteers

=== The Prince Albert Volunteers ===
- Originated 15 May 1924 by the reorganization of The North Saskatchewan Regiment as The Battleford Light Infantry and The Prince Albert Volunteers
- Amalgamated 15 December 1936 and redesignated as The Prince Albert and Battleford Volunteers
- Redesignated 1 May 1941 as The Prince Albert Volunteers
- Redesignated 5 March 1942 as the 2nd (Reserve) Battalion, The Prince Albert Volunteers
- Amalgamated 1 April 1946 with The Battleford Light Infantry (16th/22nd Saskatchewan Horse) (Reserve)

=== The Saskatoon Light Infantry (Machine Gun) ===
- Originated 15 May 1924 by the reorganization of The North Saskatchewan Regiment as The Saskatoon Light Infantry
- Amalgamated 15 December 1936 with C Company of the 12th Machine Gun Battalion, CMGC (now The Royal Regina Rifles) and redesignated as The Saskatoon Light Infantry (Machine Gun)
- Redesignated 7 November 1940 as the 2nd (Reserve) Battalion, The Saskatoon Light Infantry (Machine Gun)
- Redesignated 1 November 1945 as The Saskatoon Light Infantry (Machine Gun)
- Amalgamated 17 February 1955 with The Prince Albert and Battleford Volunteers (Machine Gun) as reorganized as a two battalion unit with the 1st Battalion, The North Saskatchewan Regiment (The Prince Albert and Battleford Volunteers) (Machine Gun) and the 2nd Battalion, The North Saskatchewan Regiment (The Saskatoon Light Infantry) (Machine Gun) on the Reserve Force order of battle

=== 52nd Regiment Prince Albert Volunteers ===
- Originated January 1913 in Prince Albert, Saskatchewan as an "Infantry Corps, consisting of 8 companies."
- Designated 1 February 1913 as the 52nd Regiment Prince Albert Volunteers
- Amalgamated 15 March 1920 with the 105th Regiment (Saskatoon Fusiliers)

=== Lineage chart ===
Lineage chart 1885–1914

1885	Moose Mountain Scouts (Note: Active service)	Infy Coy at Battleford
1885	Disbanded	Disbanded
1905	The 16th Mounted Rifles
1907	A Sqn, CMR	B Sqn, CMR
1908	The 16th Light Horse	22nd Sask. Light Horse
1912	105th Regt "Fusiliers"
1913	52nd Regt "Prince Albert Volunteers"'

Lineage chart 1914–1936

The 16th Light Horse	22nd Sask. Light Horse	52nd Regt "Prince Albert Volunteers"'	105th Regt "Fusiliers"
1914	1st Regt, CMR, CEF	9th Regt, CMR, CEF	10th Regt, CMR, CEF	53rd Bn, CEF	5th Bn, CEF	105th Regt (Saskatoon Fusiliers)
1915	65th "Overseas" Bn, CEF
1916	1st Bn, CMR, CEF	Absorbed by Canadian Cavy Reserve Depot and 1st and 5th Bn, CMR	Absorbed by Canadian Cavy Reserve Depot	232nd "Overseas" Bn, CEF	Absorbed by units of 4th Canadian Div.
1917	Absorbed by 15th Reserve Bn	Disbanded
1920	Disbanded	Disbanded
1920	1st Regt, 16th Canadian Light Horse	1st Regt (1st CMR Bn, CEF), The Sask. Mounted Rifles	2nd Regt (9th CMR Bn, CEF), (Note: Reserve) The Sask. Mounted Rifles	3rd Regt (10th CMR Bn, CEF), The Sask. Mounted Rifles	4th Bn, The North Sask. Regt	2nd Bn (Prince Albert Volunteers), The North Sask. Regt	7th Bn (188th Bn, CEF), The North Sask. Regt	1st Bn (5th Bn, CEF), The North Sask. Regt	5th Bn (65th Bn, CEF), The North Sask. Regt
1924	1st Bn (232nd Bn, CEF), The Battleford Light Infy	1st Bn (53rd Bn, CEF), The Prince Albert Volunteers	2nd Bn (188th Bn, CEF), The Prince Albert Volunteers	1st Bn (5th Bn, CEF), The Saskatoon Light Infy	2nd Bn (65th Bn, CEF), The Saskatoon Light Infy
1924	2nd Bn, The Prince Albert Volunteers
1926	2nd Regt (9th Regt CMR, CEF), The Sask. Mounted Rifles	3rd Regt (10th Regt CMR, CEF), The Sask. Mounted Rifles
1932	Perpetuates Moose Mountain Scouts	Perpetuates Infy Coy, Battleford
C Coy, 12th MG Bn, CMGC
1936	16th/22nd Sask. Horse	Disbanded	Disbanded	The Prince Albert and Battleford Volunteers	Disbanded	The Saskatoon Light Infy (MG)	Disbanded

Lineage chart 1936–present

16th/22nd Sask. Horse	The Prince Albert and Battleford Volunteers	The Saskatoon Light Infy (MG)
1939	The Saskatoon Light Infy (MG), CASF
1940	16th/22nd Sask. Horse, CASF	16th/22nd Sask. Horse (Reserve)	1st Bn, The Saskatoon Light Infy (MG), CASF	2nd (Reserve) Bn, The Saskatoon Light Infy (MG)
1941	2nd (Reserve) Bn, 16th/22nd Sask. Horse	The Prince Albert Volunteers
1941	2nd (Reserve) Bn, The Battleford Light Infy (16th/22nd Sask. Horse)
1942	20th Recce Bn (16/22 Sask. Horse), CAC, CASF	1st Bn, The Prince Albert Volunteers, CASF	2nd (Reserve) Bn, The Prince Albert Volunteers
1942	20th Army Tank Regt (16/22 Sask. Horse), CAC, CASF
1943	Disbanded	1st Infy Div. Support Bn (The Saskatoon Light Infy), CIC, CASF
1944	The Battleford Light Infy (16th/22nd Sask. Horse) (Reserve)	1st Bn, The Saskatoon Light Infy (MG), CASF
1945	Disbanded	Cannon Coy, 1st Canadian Infy Regt (The Saskatoon Light Infy (MG)), CAPF	Cannon Coy, 2nd Canadian Infy Regt (The Saskatoon Light Infy (MG)), CAPF	Cannon Coy, 3rd Canadian Infy Regt (The Saskatoon Light Infy (MG)), CAPF
1945	Disbanded	The Saskatoon Light Infy (MG)	Disbanded	Disbanded	Disbanded
1946	The Prince Albert and Battleford Volunteers
1947	50th Fd Sqn, RCE
1954	The Prince Albert and Battleford Volunteers (MG)
1955	1st Bn, The North Sask. Regt (The Prince Albert and Battleford Volunteers) (MG)	2nd Bn, The North Sask. Regt (The Saskatoon Light Infy) (MG)
1958	1st Bn, The North Sask. Regt (The Prince Albert and Battleford Volunteers)	2nd Bn, The North Sask. Regt (The Saskatoon Light Infy)
1970	The North Sask. Regt

== Alliances ==
- United Kingdom - The Rifles

== Notes ==
Preceded by The Lake Superior Scottish Regiment	The North Saskatchewan Regiment	Succeeded by The Royal Regina Rifles
