= Operation Gauntlet =

1941 Allied World War II Operation in the Arctic Campaign

- Part of the Arctic Campaign of the Second World War
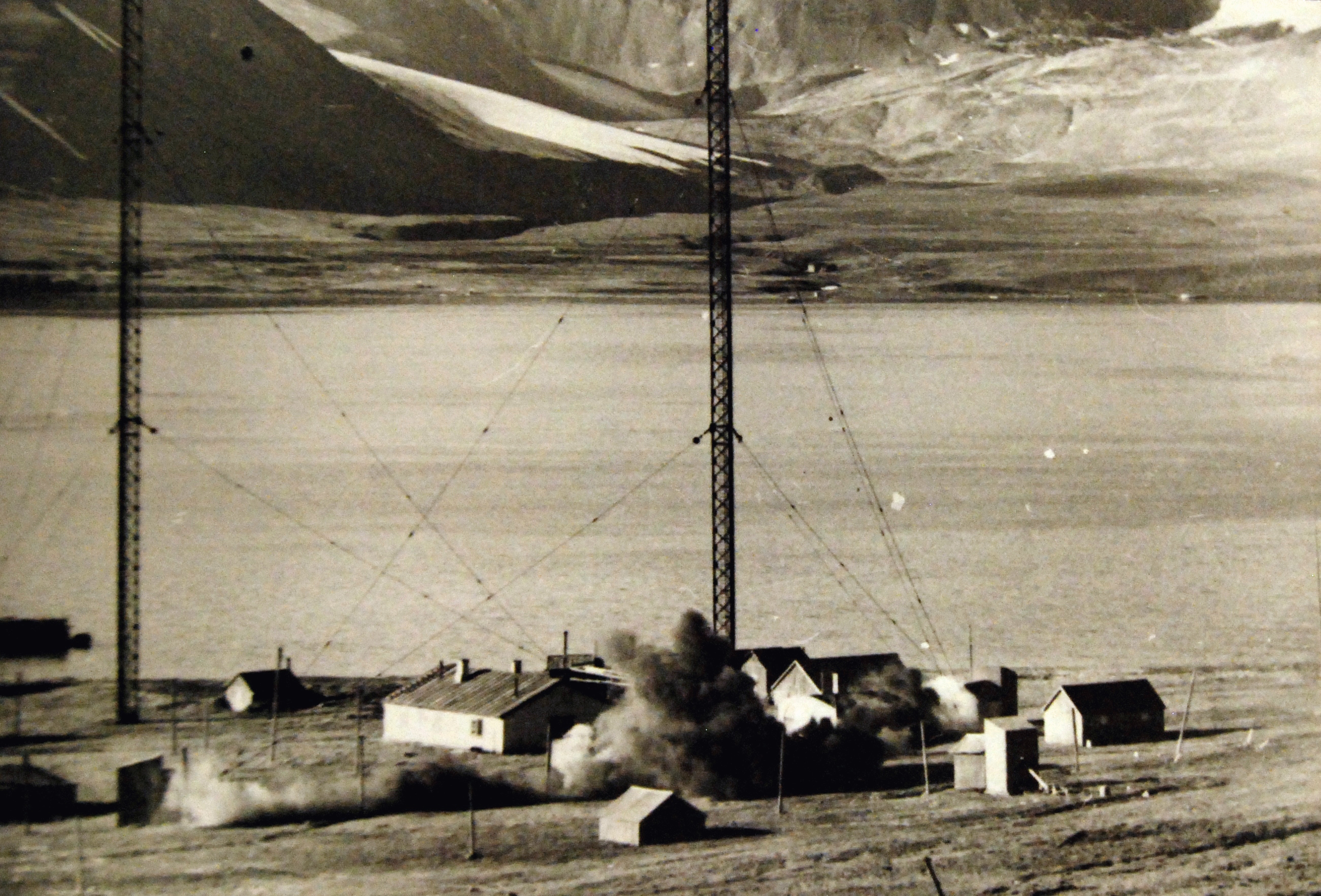
- Demolition of a German wireless station
- Type: Raid
- Location: Spitzbergen, Svalbard, Norway; 78°14′48″N 15°40′38″E
- Planned: Combined Operations
- Commanded by: Arthur Potts; Philip Vian; Ragnvald Tamber
- Objective: Deny Germans natural resources; Deny Germans weather reports; Repatriate local population, scientists and POWs
- Date: 25 August – 3 September 1941
- Outcome: Success
- Casualties: None

Operation Gauntlet was an Allied Combined Operation from 25 August until 3 September 1941, during the Second World War. Canadian, British and Norwegian armed forces in exile (Utefronten, Outside Front) landed on the Norwegian island of Spitzbergen in the Svalbard Archipelago, 650 mi (1,050 km) south of the North Pole.

Coal mines on the islands were owned and operated by Norway at Longyearbyen and by the Soviet Union at Barentsburg; both governments agreed to their destruction and the evacuation of their nationals. The objective of Gauntlet was to deny Germany the coal, mining and shipping infrastructure, equipment and stores on Spitzbergen and suppress the wireless stations on the archipelago, to prevent the Germans receiving weather reports.

Gauntlet was a success; the Germans were ignorant of the expedition until after it had departed, the raiders suffered no casualties, the civilians were repatriated, coal dumps were set on fire and mining equipment destroyed, several ships were taken as prizes and a German warship was sunk on the return journey.

== Background ==
=== Svalbard Archipelago ===
Topographical map of Svalbard

The Svalbard Archipelago lies in the Arctic Ocean about halfway [650 mi (1,050 km)] between northern Norway and the North Pole. The islands are mountainous, their peaks permanently covered with snow and some are glaciated. There are occasional river terraces at the bottom of steep valleys and some coastal plain. In winter, snow covers the islands and the bays ice over. The main island, Spitzbergen, to the west, has several large fiords along its west coast; Isfjorden is up to 10 mi (16 km) wide. The Gulf Stream warms the waters, making the sea ice-free during the summer. There are settlements at Longyearbyen and Barentsburg (inlets along the south shore of Isfjorden), in Kongsfjorden (Kings Bay), north of Isfjorden up the coast and in Van Mijenfjorden to the south.

The settlements had attracted colonists from several countries and the Svalbard Treaty of 1920 neutralized the islands and recognised the mineral and fishing rights of the participating countries. Before 1939, the population consisted of about 3,000 people, mostly Norwegians and Russians, who worked in the mining industry. Drift mines were linked to the shore by overhead cable tracks or rails and coal dumped over the winter was collected after the summer thaw. By 1939 production was about 500,000 long tons (510,000 t) a year, roughly evenly divided between Norway and the Soviet Union. A long ton weighs 2,240 lb; a [metric] tonne 2,205 lb.

=== Naval operations ===
From 25 July to 9 August 1940, the Admiral Hipper sailed from Trondheim to search the area from Tromsø to Bear Island and Svalbard (formerly Spitzbergen) and intercept British ships returning from Petsamo but found only a Finnish freighter. Action to deny Germany its coal exports was mooted by the British War Cabinet and the Admiralty soon after the German occupation of Norway in 1940. It was also desirable that wireless stations on the islands, which supplied un-coded weather reports which were useful for German military operations, be suppressed. After Operation Barbarossa, the German invasion of the Soviet Union on 22 June 1941, German occupation of the islands could threaten the Arctic convoy route to North Russia. On 12 July 1941, the Admiralty was ordered to assemble a force of ships to operate in the Arctic, in co-operation with the USSR, despite objections from Admiral John (Jack) Tovey, commander of the Home Fleet, who preferred to operate farther south, where there were more targets and better air cover.

Rear-Admirals Philip Vian and Geoffrey Miles flew to Polyarnoe in northern Russia and Miles established the British military mission in Moscow. Vian reported that Murmansk was too close to German-held territory, that its air defences were inadequate and that the prospects of offensive operations on German shipping were poor. Vian was then sent to reconnoitre the west coast of Spitzbergen, the main island of the Svalbard Archipelago, which was mostly ice-free and 450 mi (720 km) from northern Norway, to assess its potential as a base. The cruisers HMS Nigeria, HMS Aurora and two destroyers departed Iceland on 27 July, but Vian found that the advantages of a base at Spitzbergen were negated by the obstacles of weather and proximity to German bases in Norway. The force closed on the Norwegian coast twice and each time was discovered by Luftwaffe reconnaissance aircraft and retired.

== Prelude ==
=== Allied preparations ===
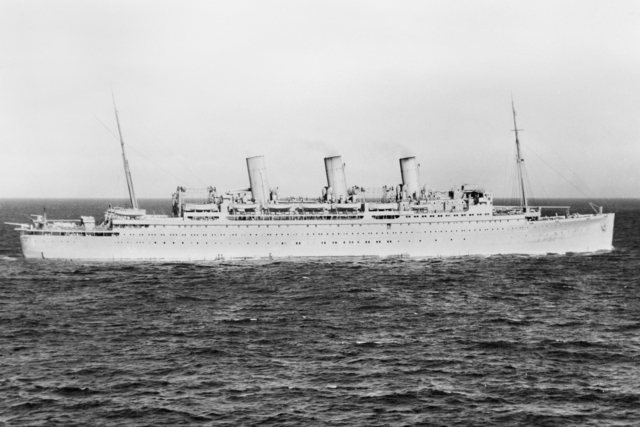
SS Empress of Canada

On 26 July 1941, the Canadian Corps in Britain offered to provide sufficient troops for a landing on Spitzbergen, to garrison a naval refuelling base for four months and then withdraw before winter. Force 111 was to be raised, comprising two battalions of a Canadian infantry brigade, less transport and attached units including an anti-aircraft battery. The Canadians offered the HQ of the 2nd Canadian Infantry Brigade (Brigadier Arthur Potts) and its signal section, the 3rd Field Company Royal Canadian Engineers (RCE).

A battalion each of Princess Patricia's Canadian Light Infantry and the Edmonton Regiment was attached and two field hospitals of the 5th Field Ambulance Royal Canadian Army Medical Corps (RCAMC) and detachments of administrative troops accompanied the expedition. The War Office added the 40th Field Battery Royal Canadian Artillery (RCA), with eight 25-pounder field guns from the 11th Field Regiment RCA; Force 111 was ready by 4 August.

The Canadians embarked on RMS Empress of Canada in Glasgow, sailed for No. 1 Combined Training Centre at HMS Quebec (shore establishment), Inveraray on Loch Fyne and began rehearsing the landings. On 11 August, Potts was told that the operation had been considerably reduced in scope, and on 16 August, Potts was ordered to ensure "that the Germans get no advantage out of Spitzbergen between now and March, 1942". The operation was to be a landing of a force sufficient for the demolition or the removal of mining equipment, coal and the transport and harbour infrastructure. Wireless and weather stations were to be disabled; the Russians were to be transported to Arkhangelsk and the Norwegians to Britain.

Russian and Norwegian civilian representatives and a Norwegian army officer, the Governor Designate of Spitzbergen, would accompany the expedition to manage civilian matters. Force 111 returned to Surrey except for the 2nd Canadian Infantry Brigade HQ with 29 Canadian officers and 498 other ranks from the Edmonton Regiment (Major W. G. Bury) and the 3rd Field Company RCE (Major Geoffrey Walsh), 84 men of the Saskatoon Light Infantry (M.G.) and administrative parties, 14 British officers and 79 men, including 57 Royal Engineers and a Norwegian infantry party (Captain Aubert) with three officers and 22 other ranks, a total of 645 men.

== Operation Gauntlet ==
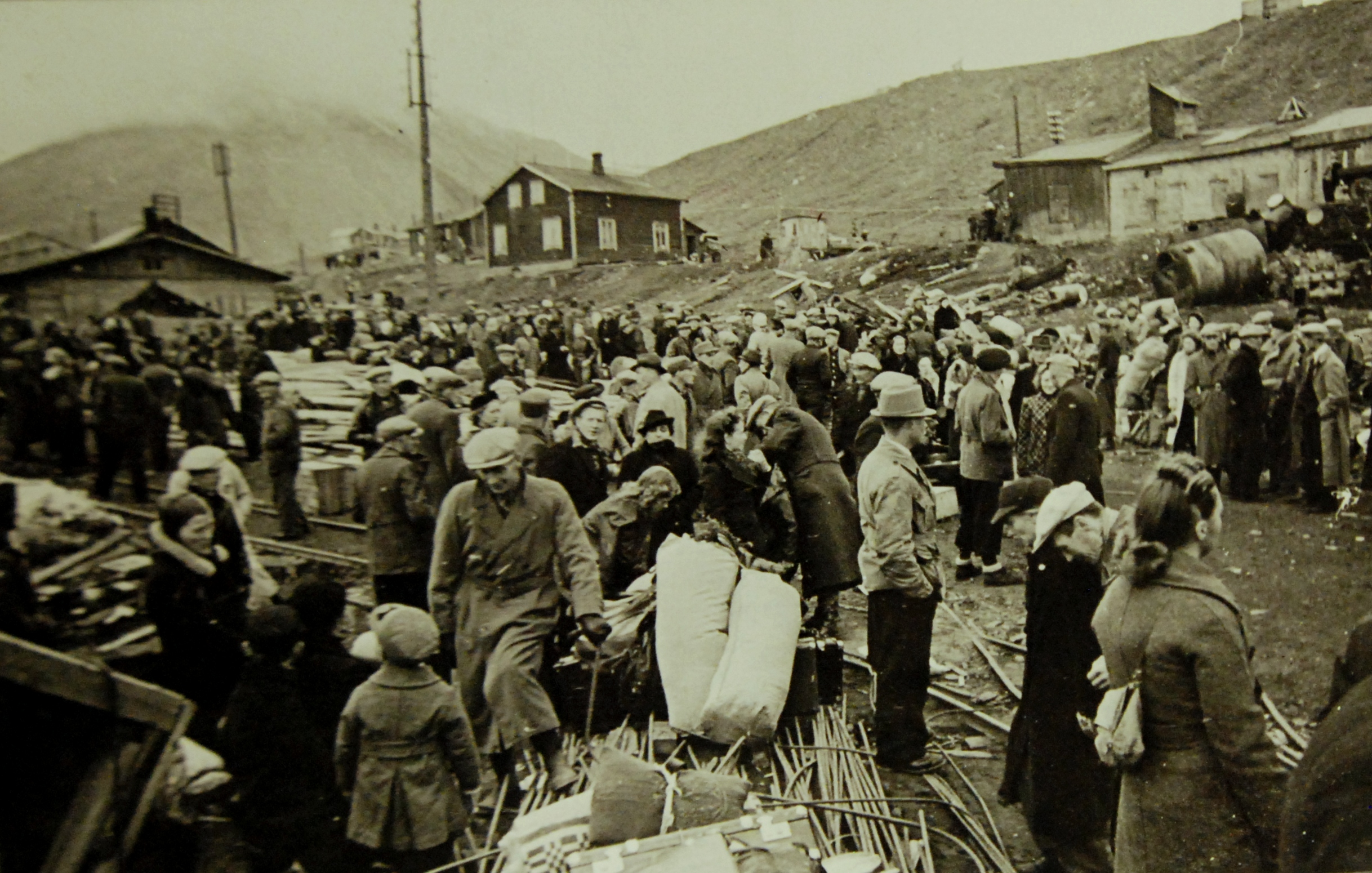
Norwegian population readying for evacuation from Longyearbyen

The expedition sailed from the River Clyde on 19 August in Empress of Canada and rendezvoused with Force A (Vian) with the cruisers Nigeria, Aurora and the destroyers HMS Anthony, Antelope and Icarus. The ships put in at Hvalfjörður in Iceland to refuel and departed on the evening of 21 August. Late on 22 August, the destination of the force was revealed to the troops. Force A met the oiler Oligarch and its trawler escorts on the evening of 24 August, west of Spitzbergen and as the force approached, an aircraft made a reconnaissance flight over Isfjorden, the large inlet on the western coast of Spitzbergen island, the most populated area of the archipelago. At 4:30 a.m., Icarus landed a signal party at the Kap Linne wireless station at the entrance to the fiord, where they were welcomed by the Norwegian operators. The big ships entered Isfjorden, steamed on to Grønfjorden at 8:00 a.m. and anchored off the Soviet mining township of Barentsburg. Potts went ashore to confer with the Soviet authorities about the embarkation of the population and its delivery to Archangelsk as the Canadians occupied other Soviet and Norwegian settlements along Isfjord.

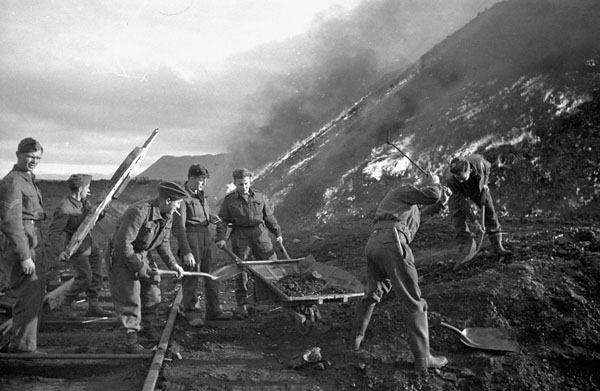
Sappers of the 3rd Field Company, Royal Canadian Engineers, burning coal piles during Operation Gauntlet (photograph: war correspondent Ross Munro)

The evacuation proceeded slower than planned because the Soviet Consul wanted machinery and stores loaded on Empress of Canada as well as personal effects. Empress of Canada set out for Archangelsk at midnight on the night of 26/27 August, escorted by Nigeria and the destroyers. Aurora stayed behind to guard the landing parties and assist in the embarkations from the remoter settlements. The Canadian engineers set fire to about 450,000 long tons (460,000 t) of coal dumped at the mines, fuel oil was poured into the sea or burned and mining equipment was removed or sabotaged, during which, Barentsburg was mysteriously burned down. On the evening of 1 September, the Empress of Canada and its escorts returned from Archangelsk to Green Bay.

Normal business was kept up at the wireless station by the Norwegian Military Governor Designate, Lieutenant Ragnvald Tamber except for bogus reports of fog, to deter Luftwaffe air reconnaissance. Three colliers sent from the mainland were hijacked along with a whaler, icebreaker, tug and two fishing boats. On 2 September, about 800 Norwegians boarded Empress as did 186 French prisoners of war, who had escaped from German captivity and been interned in the USSR until the German invasion. Force A sailed for home at 10:30 p.m. on 3 September, with 800 Norwegian civilians and the prizes, after a ten days' occupation, having never been in darkness. Anders Halvorssen preferred not to join the Norwegian army-in-exile, hid and remained on the island. The final wireless message was transmitted on the evening of 3 September and the sets at Barentsburg, Longyearbyen, Kap Linné and Grønfjord were destroyed; as Force A made its return journey, a German station was heard calling Spitzbergen. The spurious weather reports had led to the cancellation of Luftwaffe weather reconnaissance flights by the Wettererkundungsstaffel (Wekusta 5).

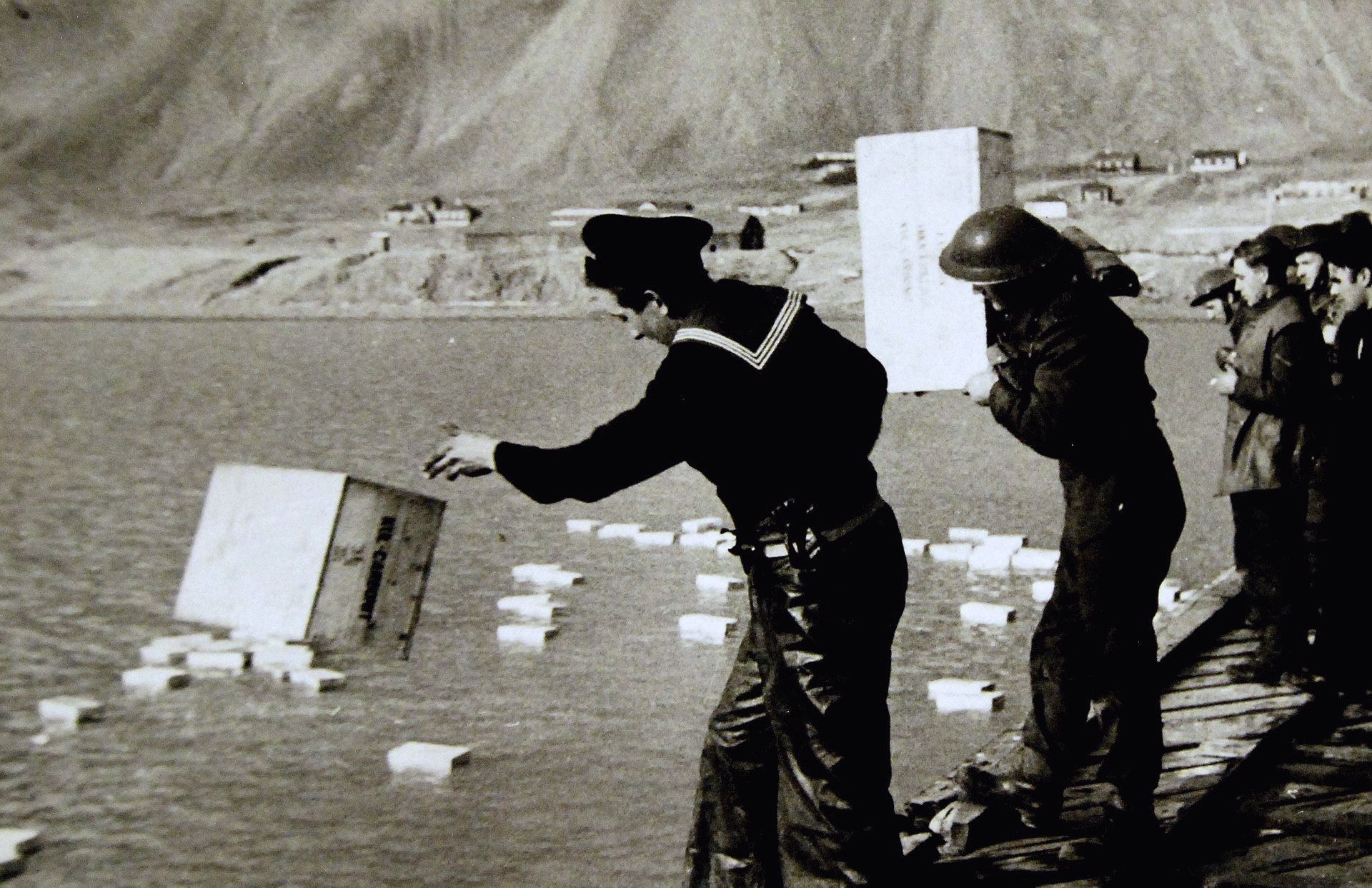
Destroying mining explosives unable to be removed, Ny-Ålesund

On 5 September a Luftwaffe sortie was flown over Svalbard and the crew found Spitzbergen deserted and the coal dumps on fire. Wekusta 5 resumed flights and on 10 September the crew saw Halvorssen waving to them at Longyearbyen. The crew saw a river terrace at Sònak in Adventfjorden, about 4 mi (6.4 km) away, which was about 1,500 yd (1,400 m) long and could serve as a runway. On 25 September, a Ju 52 landed safely at Sònak but was unable to send a message due to the low power of its radio; a Ju 88 managed to land on 27 September, finding the party and the Norwegian defector. A plan to establish a temporary base was abandoned after an odd illumination, resembling searchlights, was seen in the sky; the two aircraft hurriedly took off for Norway in case it was the British.

The British cruisers diverted towards the Norwegian coast to hunt for German ships and early on 7 September, in stormy weather and poor visibility, found a German convoy off Porsanger Municipality, near the North Cape. The cruisers sank the training ship Bremse but Barcelona and Trautenfels, two troop transports with 1,500 men of the 6th Mountain Division aboard, escaped into the fjord. Nigeria was thought to have been damaged by hitting a wreck but after the war it was surmised that it had hit a mine. Force A reached the Clyde on the night of 7/8 September.

== Aftermath ==
=== Analysis ===
Finnmark municipality in north Norway (in red) around Porsangerfjorden

Gauntlet was a success; the Germans had not known of or had been able to challenge the expedition. The raiders had suffered no casualties, the local civilians were repatriated, several ships were taken as prizes and one German warship was sunk on the return journey. After the operation, the British expected the Germans to occupy Svalbard as a base for attacks on Arctic convoys but the Germans were more interested in meteorological data, the Arctic being the origin of much of the weather over western Europe.

=== Subsequent operations ===
Arctic expert Erich Etienne made a proposal on his return to Norway, to set up a weather station on Svalbard to obtain better weather data and to relieve Wekusta 5 of the burden of flying in the long night of the polar winter. Operation Bansö (Unternehmen Bansö) began on 8 October with the flight of a Ju 52 to Svalbard to transport a weather party of four men and ten labourers to convert a house 2.5 mi (4.0 km) from Longyearbyen, near the landing ground at Sònak. On 18 October, the crew of a Ju 52 heading for Longyearbyen saw several British ships near the island and next day the crew of a Heinkel He 111 spotted four British minesweepers in Isfjorden. The two Ju 52s and the He 111 abandoned the airstrip; engine trouble delayed one of the Ju 52s for two hours but clouds of dust in the valley obscured the German aircraft and they went unseen. The all-clear was given on 22 October and by 9 November, Bansö was operational, after 38 flights which carried 5 long tons (5.1 t) of equipment and 24 builders to the island; on 2 November, a Ju 88 escort for a Ju 52 was caught by a gale-force wind and crashed soon after taking off from Banak, with the loss of the crew.

== Order of battle ==
Data taken from Dean and Lackenbauer [2017] unless indicated.

Canadian

- Headquarters, 2nd Canadian Infantry Brigade
- Signals Section, 2nd Canadian Infantry Brigade
- 3 Field Company, Royal Canadian Engineers
- D Company, plus one platoon, C Company, Loyal Edmonton Regiment
- Saskatoon Light Infantry (Machine Gun, Composite detachment)
- Detachment, Royal Canadian Army Medical Corps (5 Field Ambulance)
- X Canadian Field Cash Office, Royal Canadian Army Pay Corps
- Empress of Canada Ship's Staff (from Edmonton Regiment)

Norwegian

- Detachment, Norwegian Infantry

British

- Detachment, Kent Corps Troops, Royal Engineers (RE)
- Detachment, 992 Docks Operations Company, RE
- Detachment, B Section 1 Motor Boat Company, Royal Army Service Corps (RASC)
- Detachment, 60 Detail Issue Depot RASC
- D Field Cash Office, Royal Army Pay Corps
- Royal Engineers, Attached 2nd Canadian Brigade Headquarters
- Intelligence Corps
- Army Film Unit
- Major H. C. Smith, Liaison Officer (Canadian in British service)
- Captain E. W. Proctor, Royal Engineers
- Major A. W. Salmon, RASC

== See also ==
- Operation Fritham
- Operation Gearbox
- Operation Gearbox II
- Operation Zitronella
- Operation Haudegen
