= Terrace mutiny =

Revolt by Canadian Army soldiers

The Terrace mutiny was a revolt by Canadian Army soldiers based in Terrace, British Columbia, during the Second World War. The mutiny, which began on November 24, 1944, and ended on November 29 was the most serious breach of discipline in Canadian military history. The mutiny was triggered by the rumour that conscript soldiers based on the home front would be deployed overseas.

== Root causes ==
As had occurred in Canada during the First World War, conscription was a divisive issue in Canadian politics. During the election campaign of 1940, Liberal leader William Lyon Mackenzie King promised to limit Canada's direct military involvement in the war. This was possible in the early years of the war, and those who were conscripted were deployed on the home front. However, as the war progressed, mounting losses combined with a lack of volunteers put greater pressure on the government to send conscripts overseas. Facing pressure from his cabinet, in late November 1944 Mackenzie King agreed to a one-time assignment of conscripts for overseas service.

Eight months prior to the mutiny, conscripts were put under increasing pressure to "go active". One of the best recorded examples occurred at Vernon Military Camp where, according to the war diaries of the Régiment de Hull, junior officers were encouraged to identify conscripts who were strongly opposed to converting so that they could be removed from the camp to a segregated tent camp referred to as "Zombieville." Any senior non-commissioned officer who did not volunteer for overseas service was demoted. Elsewhere in British Columbia, conscripts alleged being bribed with alcohol or money, reduced in rank, placed in isolation where they were subjected to freezing temperatures, and refused medical attention in order to persuade them to volunteer for overseas service. These methods increased resentment within the conscript ranks and lowered morale. The men separated into the tent towns at Camp Vernon were later transferred into the Fusiliers du S^{t}-Laurent.

At the time the Mackenzie King government was reconsidering its conscription policy, the 15th Canadian Infantry Brigade of Pacific Command was stationed in Terrace, in northwestern British Columbia. At that time, the town had less than 500 residents. The 15th Brigade, which numbered approximately 3000 men, was composed largely of conscripts, with a significant number of French Canadians, most of whom were uninterested in fighting in any theatre of the Second World War. The morale of the 15th Brigade was low, largely due to the poor relationship between the soldiers and the local populace, the isolation of the post, the damp weather, lack of recreation, crowded facilities, and the distance from home for most of the men.

== Mutiny ==
Many of the officers of the brigade were in Vancouver when news that conscripts might be deployed overseas reached the soldiers stationed in Terrace. Many soldiers at Terrace began to disobey orders of their officers. On November 24, 1944, members of the Fusiliers du S^{t}-Laurent, which made up part of the 15th Brigade, stated they had resolved to resist any efforts to deploy them overseas. Some seized weapons. The mutiny spread to other elements of the 15th Brigade. News came in that conscripts stationed elsewhere in the province were resisting as well.

By November 28, the mutiny waned. Officers, led by Major General George Pearkes, regained control and imposed order and discipline on the troops. Many mutineers returned the weapons they had taken. The mutiny exhausted itself by the next day. By that time, the Prince Albert Volunteers and other units were being shipped out of Terrace.

== Cover-up ==
The government and military were fearful that the mutiny would spread and impair the war effort. The authorities pressured censors to apply federal press censorship regulations more strictly. Because these efforts were largely successful, the mutiny was not well known among the general public and the event remained an obscure event in Canadian history.

== See also ==
- List of incidents of civil unrest in Canada

== Sources ==
- German, Daniel (January 1996). "Press censorship and the Terrace Mutiny: a case study in Second World War information management". Journal of Canadian Studies. 31 (4): 124–142. Archived from the original on May 23, 2007 – via FindArticles.
- Roy, Reginald "Mutiny in the Mountains: The Terrace, British Columbia Incident" (p. 49-69), in Men at War. Politics, Technology and Innovations in the Twentieth Century, Precedent Publishing, 1982
- University of Victoria Archives and Special Collections: George Pearkes project .
