= 96th Battalion (Canadian Highlanders), CEF =

Infantry battalion of the Great War Canadian Expeditionary Force

The 96th Battalion (Canadian Highlanders), CEF, was an infantry battalion of the Great War Canadian Expeditionary Force. The 96th Battalion was authorized on 28 November 1915 and embarked for Britain on 27 September 1916, where its personnel were absorbed by the 92nd Battalion (48th Highlanders), CEF to provide reinforcements for the Canadian Corps in the field. The battalion disbanded on 8 October 1916.

The 96th Battalion recruited in Saskatoon and district was mobilized at Saskatoon, Saskatchewan.

The 96th Battalion was commanded by Lt.-Col. J. Glenn from 6 October 1916 to 8 October 1916.

The 96th Battalion was awarded the battle honour THE GREAT WAR 1916.

The 96th Battalion (Canadian Highlanders), CEF, is perpetuated by The North Saskatchewan Regiment.

== Sources ==
Canadian Expeditionary Force 1914–1919 by Col. G.W.L. Nicholson, CD, Queen's Printer, Ottawa, Ontario, 1962
