= 53rd Battalion (Northern Saskatchewan), CEF =

53rd Battalion, CEF
- Active: 1914–17
- Disbanded: 1917
- Country: Canada
- Branch: Canadian Expeditionary Force
- Type: Infantry
- Mobilization headquarters: Winnipeg
- Theatre of war honour: The Great War, 1916–17

Commanders
- Commanding officer: Lt-Col R.M. Dennistoun

The 53rd Battalion (Northern Saskatchewan), CEF, was an infantry battalion of the Canadian Expeditionary Force during the Great War. The 53rd Battalion was authorized on 7 November 1914 and embarked for Great Britain on 29 March 1916. It provided reinforcements for the Canadian Corps in the field until it was disbanded on 12 October 1917.

The 53rd Battalion recruited in Prince Albert, Saskatoon, the Battlefords and Melfort, Saskatchewan, and was mobilized at Winnipeg, Manitoba.

The 53rd Battalion was commanded by Lieutenant-Colonel R.M. Dennistoun from 1 April 1916 to 1 August 1916.

The 53rd Battalion was awarded the theatre of war honour The Great War, 1916–17.

The perpetuation of the 53rd Battalion was initially assigned in 1922 to 2nd Battalion (53rd Battalion, CEF) The North Saskatchewan Regiment (in Prince Albert), and because of a series of reorganizations and amalgamations it is now perpetuated by The North Saskatchewan Regiment.

- 2nd Battalion (53rd Battalion, CEF) The North Saskatchewan Regiment: 1922–1924
- 1st Battalion (53rd Battalion, CEF) The Prince Albert Volunteers: 1924–1936
- The Prince Albert and Battleford Volunteers: 1936–1941
- The Prince Albert Volunteers: 1941–1946
- The Prince Albert and Battleford Volunteers: 1946–1954
- The Prince Albert and Battleford Volunteers (Machine Gun): 1954–1955
- The North Saskatchewan Regiment (Machine Gun): 1955–1958
- The North Saskatchewan Regiment: 1958–present

== Sources ==
Canadian Expeditionary Force 1914-1919 by Col. G.W.L. Nicholson, CD, Queen's Printer, Ottawa, Ontario, 1962
