= 232nd (Saskatchewan) Battalion, CEF =

Unit in the Canadian Expeditionary Force during World War One

The 232nd (Saskatchewan) Battalion, CEF was a unit in the Canadian Expeditionary Force during the First World War. Based in North Battleford, Saskatchewan, the unit began recruiting in early 1916 in that town and the surrounding district. The battalion had a strength of 13 officers and 286 other ranks. After sailing to England in April 1917, the battalion was absorbed into the 15th Reserve Battalion on June 9, 1917. The 232nd (Saskatchewan) Battalion, CEF had one Officer Commanding: Lieut-Col. R. P. Laurie.

This battalion is perpetuated by The North Saskatchewan Regiment.
