= 33rd (East Prussian) Fusiliers "Count Roon" =

Military unit

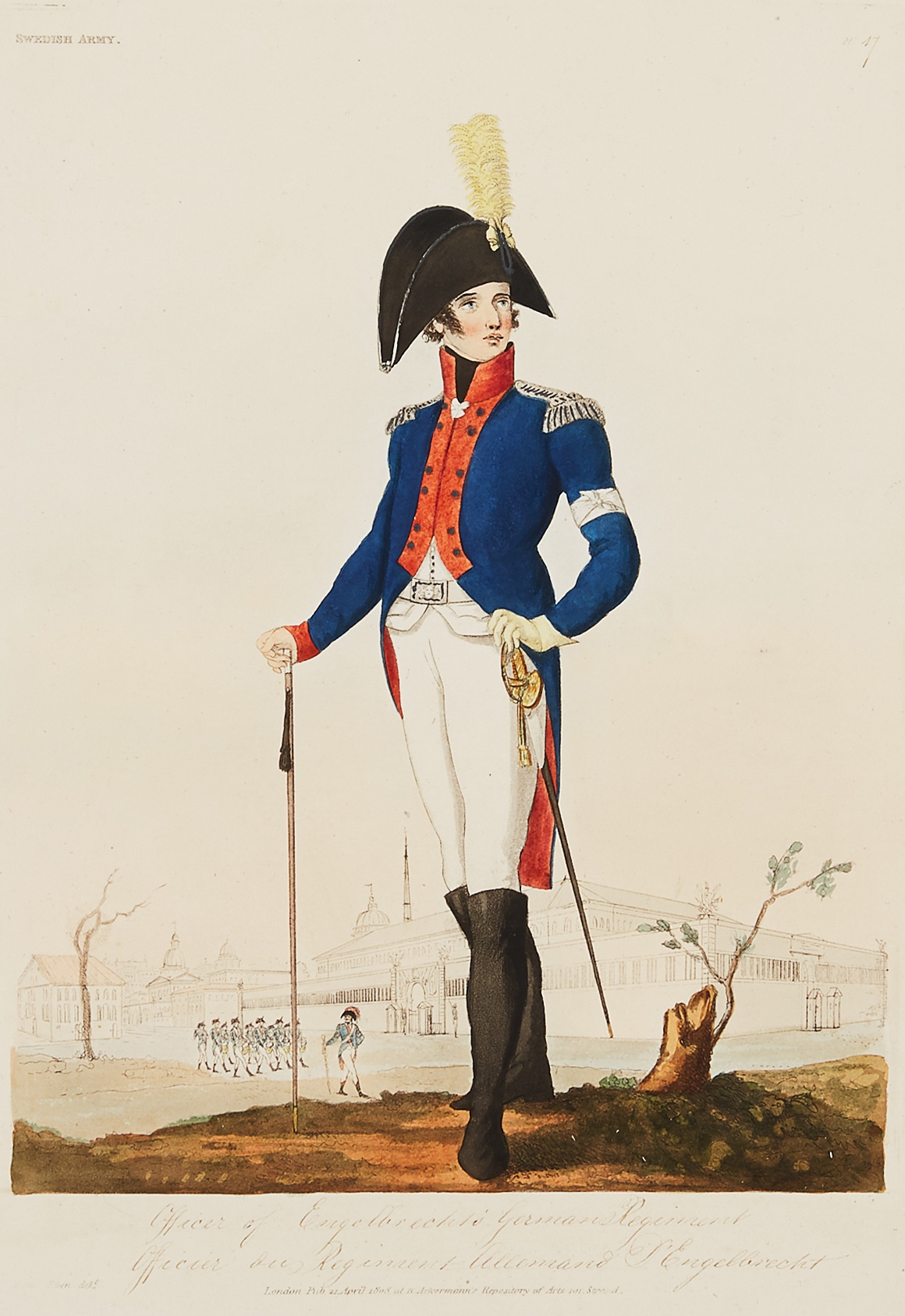

The 33rd (East Prussian) Fusiliers "Count Roon" was a regiment of the Imperial German Army through the First World War. The Regiment was Swedish until 1815.

In August 1914 the unit was part of the 2nd Division of the Königsberg-based I Corps. With the Russian invasion of East Prussia in August 1914, the unit saw action during the prelude to the Battle of Tannenberg. The 33rd Fusiliers charged the Russian-occupied village of Mallwischken near Gumbinnen and cleared the area. Later as the battle for East Prussia developed, the regiment occupied high ground near the village of Usdau.

== See also ==
- List of Imperial German infantry regiments
