= 2nd Canadian Infantry Brigade =

Infantry brigade of the Canadian Army during World Wars I and II

2nd Canadian Brigade 2nd Canadian Infantry Brigade
- Active: 1914–1919; 1939–1945
- Country: Canada
- Branch: Canadian Army
- Type: Infantry
- Size: Brigade
- Part of: 1st Canadian Division
- Engagements: World War I: Second Battle of Ypres; Battle of the Somme; Battle of Vimy Ridge; Battle of Passchendaele; World War II: Operation Gauntlet; Invasion of Sicily; Italian campaign

Commanders
- Notable commanders: Arthur Currie; Louis Lipsett; Bert Hoffmeister

The 2nd Canadian Infantry Brigade was a formation of the Canadian Army that served in both World War I and World War II. The brigade fought on the Western Front during World War I, and in Sicily and Italy during the Second World War. In both wars, the brigade formed part of the 1st Canadian Division.

The brigade was first commanded from its formation in September 1914 to September 1915 by Arthur Currie.

== Order of Battle ==
=== World War I ===
- 5th Battalion (Western Cavalry), CEF. August 1914 – November 11, 1918;
- 6th Battalion (Fort Garrys), CEF. August 1914 – December 1914 (Became Canadian Cavalry Depot);
- 7th Battalion (1st British Columbia), CEF. August 1914 – November 11, 1918;
- 8th Battalion (90th Winnipeg Rifles), CEF. August 1914 – November 11, 1918;
- 10th Battalion (Canadians), CEF. January 1915 – November 11, 1918.

=== World War II ===
- Headquarters, 2nd Infantry Brigade, C.A.S.F.
- 1st Battalion, The Princess Patricia's Canadian Light Infantry, C.A.S.F.
- 1st Battalion, The Seaforth Highlanders of Canada, C.A.S.F.
- 1st Battalion, The Loyal Edmonton Regiment, C.A.S.F.
- 2nd Infantry Brigade Ground Defence Platoon (Lorne Scots), C.A.S.F. (Added 6 February 1941)
- 2nd Infantry Anti-Tank Company, C.A.S.F. (Deleted 5 February 1941)

== Brigade Commanders during the Second World War ==
- Brigadier G.R. Pearkes: 17 October 1939 – 19 July 1940
- (Position Vacant / under Acting Command): 20 – 28 July 1940
- Brigadier A.E. Potts: 29 July 1940 – 19 May 1942
- (Position Vacant / under Acting Command): 20 May – 23 June 1942
- Brigadier C. Vokes: 24 June 1942 – 31 October 1943
- Brigadier B.M. Hoffmeister: 1 November 1943 – 19 March 1944
- Brigadier T.G. Gibson: 13 April – 6 October 1944
- Brigadier M.P. Bogert: 7 October 1944 – 4 June 1945
- (Position Vacant / under Acting Command): 5 June – 15 September 1945 (Disbanded)
