= 64th Field Battery, RCA =

- 64^{e} Batterie de campagne, ARC (French)
- Country: Canada
- Branch: Canadian Army
- Type: Field artillery
- Size: One battery
- Part of: 10th Field Artillery Regiment, RCA
- Garrison/HQ: Yorkton, Saskatchewan
- Motto: Ubique (Latin for 'everywhere')
- Colors: The guns

The 64th Field Battery, RCA (French: 64^{e} Batterie de campagne, ARC) is a sub-unit of the Canadian Army. It is a reserve artillery battery, under command of the 38 Canadian Brigade Group Artillery Tactical Group, and a component of 10th Field Artillery Regiment, RCA.

== History ==
The Yorkton Regiment was organized on 15 May 1924, after the reorganization of The North Saskatchewan Regiment (1920–1924) into four separate regiments: The Saskatoon Regiment, The Prince Albert Volunteers, The Battleford Light Infantry and The Yorkton Regiment.

Reportedly its Regimental Headquarters and A Company was at Yorkton, Saskatchewan; its B Company at Melville, Saskatchewan; its C Company at Kamsack, Saskatchewan; and its D Company at Buchanan, Saskatchewan.

The regiment perpetuated the 188th (Saskatchewan) Battalion, CEF.

During the 1936 Canadian Militia reorganization, on 14 December 1936, The Yorkton Regiment was converted from infantry to artillery and was redesignated as the 64th (Yorkton) Field Battery, RCA.

The 64th (Yorkton) Field Battery did not initially mobilize for the Second World War.

In 1941, an active service unit was raised, which saw service with the 6th Canadian Infantry Division on the west coast. The battery later travelled to the United Kingdom, where it was broken up for reinforcements. Concurrently, a reserve battery continued its part-time service in Saskatchewan. Both batteries bore the designation "64th (Yorkton)".

After the Second World War, the battery was briefly designated as a heavy anti-aircraft battery, before converting back to field artillery in the mid-1950s. Originally a sub-unit of the 53rd Field Artillery Regiment, RCA, the battery was reassigned to the 10th Field Regiment in 1968.

== Yorkton Armoury ==
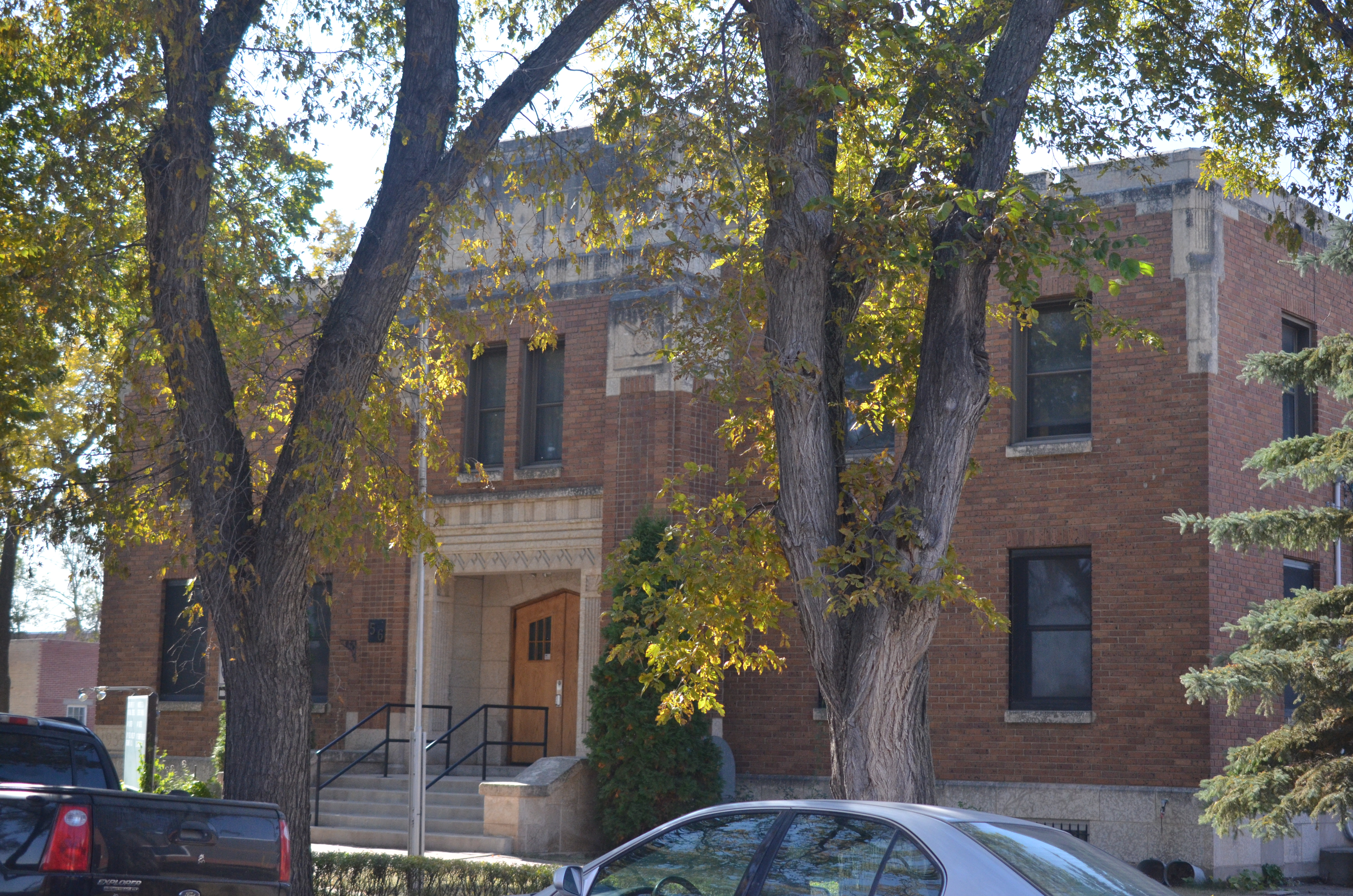
Yorkton Armoury

Early in the twentieth century, Yorkton men who had served in the Boer Wars of the 1880s and 1890s began planning for the establishment of a local militia. They approached Dr. E. L. Cash, Federal Member of Parliament for the constituency in hopes that he could influence the Dominion Government to erect military headquarters in Yorkton. With his influence, and the added encouragement of both the Board of Trade and the Town Council, authorization to organize was granted. One veteran of the last of the Boer Wars, Major Francis Pawlett was appointed officer in command of "B" Squadron, 16th Light Horse, and recruiting began.

It was decided to renovate the former Immigration Hall located across the railroad tracks, on Front Street South, between Tupper and Second Avenue. It housed 75 men and was equipped as a training centre. The drills consisted of both foot and mounted exercises.

As it happened, not long after they were organized, the First World War was declared. Sixty men of "B" Squadron headed for more training at one of Canada's largest camps at Valcartier, Quebec. The local armoury kept on being used as a recruiting centre and for basic training.

In 1920, when Yorkton's courthouse was constructed on Darlington Street, the courthouse on Livingstone became the second site for the Armoury. By 1922, it was outfitted for all units of Yorkton's militia, with officers' rooms, other ranks' rooms, drill hall, recreation centre, gymnasium, and a rifle range in the basement.

Beginning around 1929, local politicians began lobbying for a new building for the 64 (Yorkton) Field Battery, the First Yorkton Anti-Aircraft Machine Gun Battery, and the 16th Canadian Light Horse, which had been amalgamated with the Saskatchewan Mounted Rifles. The old building was inadequate, and so was the Highways warehouse that was being used for extra manoeuvres. With the help of the Federal Member of Parliament, George W. McPhee, they began plans for a new building.

It took several more years before the project could be completed. The original designs called for the main entrance to be facing south on Smith Street. By October 1938, the final plans were out. The architect was David Webster and the builder, Shoquist Construction Company, both from Saskatoon. The two-storey building, with the façade on First Avenue North was constructed of brick and Tyndal stone. Subcontracts went to local businesses: Plumber, E. H. Carter, Beck's Electric, and MacKay's Paint Shop. The total cost amounted to $32,000. The official opening took place in October 1939, one month after World War II was declared. Because of new security concerns, a ball planned for the occasion was cancelled. Only one person at a time, accompanied by a soldier could visit the premises.

Large-scale recruitment began. The main training took place at Regina and other camps. It did not take long for the soldiers to be sent to England for further mobilization.

== Current service ==
The battery operates as part of the 38 Canadian Brigade Group's Artillery Tactical Group (ATG) and operates the C3 105 mm howitzer. The armoury houses the Reserve unit of the 64th Battery of the 10th Field Regiment, RCA. The building is utilized for the general operation of the unit, with offices, a drill hall where simulated artillery training takes place, and a few classrooms. It is the home of the 2834 Royal Canadian Army Cadets Corps, as well. There is a lounge, with a fireplace for social events. No military weaponry is on exhibit, save for General Alexander Ross' sword, and a pair of pikes from the 16th Light Horse. One full-time staff is in charge of the administration and training.

== Equipment ==
Guns

- 1936–1939: 18-pounder
- 1939–1949: 25-pounder
- 1949–1955: 3.7-inch anti-aircraft gun
- 1955–1959: 25-pounder
- 1959–present: 105 mm howitzer (including C1 and C3 models)

Gun Tractors

- 1936–1939: ?
- 1939–1955: Quad Gun Tractor
- 1955–1980: M135 Truck
- 1980–present: Medium Logistics Vehicle, Wheeled

== Published histories ==
- Dorosh, Michael A. Yorkton's Gunners: The Story of the 64th (Yorkton) Field Battery, Royal Canadian Artillery (canadiansoldiers.com, 2007) ISBN 978-0-9782646-7-3
