= Prince Albert Volunteers =

- Active: 1885, 1913–1936, 1941–1946
- Disbanded: 1946
- Country: Canada
- Branch: Canadian Militia (1885, 1913-1936); Canadian Army (1941-1946)
- Type: Line Infantry
- Role: Infantry
- Size: One Regiment
- Part of: Non-Permanent Active Militia (1885, 1913-1936); Royal Canadian Infantry Corps (1942–1946)
- Garrison/HQ: Prince Albert, Saskatchewan
- Anniversaries: Battle of Duck Lake
- Engagements: North-West Rebellion; First World War; Second World War
- Battle honours: See #Battle Honours

The Prince Albert Volunteers (PAV) is the name of two historical infantry units headquartered in Prince Albert, Saskatchewan. The unit was first raised in 1885 during the North-West Rebellion and disbanded after hostilities ceased. In the 20th century, the unit was operational from 1913 to 1936 and 1941 to 1946. The PAV is now incorporated by amalgamation in the North Saskatchewan Regiment (N Sask R).

== Lineage ==
=== The Prince Albert Volunteers ===
- Originated on 2 January 1913, in Prince Albert, Saskatchewan, as the 52nd Regiment Prince Albert Volunteers.
- Amalgamated on 1 October 1920, with the 105th Regiment Saskatoon Fusiliers to form The North Saskatchewan Regiment.
- Reorganized on 15 May 1924, as one of four separate regiments: The Yorkton Regiment (now 64th Field Battery, 10th Field Artillery Regiment, RCA), The Saskatoon Light Infantry, The Battleford Light Infantry, and The Prince Albert Volunteers.
- Amalgamated on 15 December 1936, with The Battleford Light Infantry and redesignated as The Prince Albert and Battleford Volunteers.
- Redesignated on 1 May 1941, as The Prince Albert Volunteers.
- Redesignated on 5 March 1942, as the 2nd (Reserve) Battalion, The Prince Albert Volunteers.
- Amalgamated on 1 April 1946, with The Battleford Light Infantry (16th/22nd Saskatchewan Horse) (Reserve) and again redesignated as The Prince Albert and Battleford Volunteers.
- Amalgamated on 1 September 1954, with the 50th Field Squadron, RCE, and Redesignated as The Prince Albert and Battleford Volunteers (Machine Gun).
- Amalgamated on 17 February 1955, with The Saskatoon Light Infantry (Machine Gun) and redesignated as The North Saskatchewan Regiment (Machine Gun).
- Redesignated on 11 April 1958, as 1st Battalion, The North Saskatchewan Regiment (The Prince Albert and Battleford Volunteers).

== Perpetuations ==
- 53rd Battalion (Northern Saskatchewan), CEF

== History ==
=== North-West Rebellion ===
The Prince Albert Volunteers or Prince Albert Rifles were organized in Prince Albert, Saskatchewan, North-West Territories, for service in the Canadian Militia during the North-West Rebellion.

"Gentleman" Joe McKay, an Anglo-Métis scout of the North-West Mounted Police was sent to Prince Albert from Fort Carlton to enlist about 20 men as volunteers on 20 March 1885. On the 21st, 22 men were sworn in before Lieutenant-Colonel Alexander Sproat. The volunteers were commanded by Captain Moore, who had retired from the Canadian Militia. On the 23rd they arrived at Fort Carlton and were armed with Snider-Enfield rifles.

They saw their only action fighting alongside the police against Gabriel Dumont's Métis forces at the Battle of Duck Lake on March 26, 1885, where they suffered the heaviest casualties of combatants involved: of the 41 Volunteers sent, nine were killed. Most of those who died are buried at St. Mary's Anglican Church cemetery just west of Prince Albert. Nine of them were killed at Duck Lake, their bodies left on the field until emissaries from Louis Riel arranged for their safe retrieval by citizens of Prince Albert.

For the remainder of the rebellion the Volunteers stayed penned up in the stockade at Prince Albert, safeguarding the community until relieved by General Frederick Middleton and his Northwest Field Force after the Battle of Batoche.

All the Volunteers who served during the rebellion received the North West Canada Medal and a grant of 320 acres (130 ha) of land, or scrip of $80 in lieu.

==== Members killed at Duck Lake ====
- Private Joseph Anderson
- Constable James Bakie
- Constable Skeffington C. Elliott
- Constable Alexander Fisher
- Constable Daniel McKenzie
- Constable Daniel McPhail
- Constable Robert Middleton
- Captain John Morton
- Corporal William Napier

=== 20th century ===
A infantry unit was again created in Prince Albert on January 2, 1913, named the 52nd Regiment Prince Albert Volunteers. The 52nd Regiment was allied with the Oxfordshire and Buckinghamshire Light Infantry in England. Like most other Non-Permanent Active Militia (NPAM) units, the 52nd Regiment was not mobilized as a unit in the First World War, but many from the regiment signed up with the 53rd Battalion, CEF.

In the post-war reorganization of the NPAM, the 52nd Regiment was merged with 105th Regiment (Saskatoon Fusiliers) in 1920 and became the 2nd Battalion (Prince Albert Volunteers), the North Saskatchewan Regiment. In 1922 the battalion was granted the perpetuation of the 53rd Battalion. In 1924 the battalion again became a distinct regiment as the Prince Albert Volunteers.

In the 1936 Canadian Militia reorganization, the PAV were merged with The Battleford Light Infantry as the Prince Albert and Battleford Volunteers (PABV). The PABV's work in the early months of the Second World War was recognized in 2015 when the PABV's successor, N Sask R, was granted an honorary distinction to be emblazoned on its regimental colour: the wartime badge of the Regina Rifle Regiment (RRR) with the year dates "1944–45" in recognition of the role played by the PABV in the mobilization of the Canadian Active Service Force unit of the RRR.

In 1941, the cavalry unit based in the Battlefords, 16th/22nd Saskatchewan Horse (Reserve), was converted to infantry under the name 2nd (Reserve) Battalion, the Battleford Light Infantry (16th/22nd Saskatchewan Horse). The Battlefords personnel from the PABV were transferred to this unit, and the remainder of the PABV in Prince Albert were renamed to the Prince Albert Volunteers once again.

On March 5, 1942, the active service 1st Battalion PAV was formed. This battalion was stationed in Vernon, British Columbia, as part of the 19th Infantry Brigade until October 1943, when it was transferred to the 15th Infantry Brigade Group in northern British Columbia. The 15th Brigade was involved in the Terrace mutiny in November 1944. The 1st Battalion PAV was disbanded on November 30, 1945, and the regiment reverted to being a solely militia organization.

After the Second World War, 1946, the infantry in the Battlefords and Prince Albert were merged for the second time as the Prince Albert and Battleford Volunteers. After further amalgamations, Prince Albert's infantry subunit is now part of the N Sask R. The mess at the garrison in Prince Albert was renamed in 2014 to the "Prince Albert Volunteers Mess" (under leadership of Captain Luchia as president of the mess committee) to honour the sacrifices made by those serving the Prince Albert Volunteers.

Lineage of the Prince Albert Volunteers

1885	Prince Albert Volunteers	Infy Coy at Battleford
1885	Disbanded	Disbanded
1913	52nd Regt "Prince Albert Volunteers"
1914	53rd Bn, CEF
1916	232nd "Overseas" Bn, CEF
1917	Disbanded	Absorbed by 15th Reserve Bn, CEF
1920	2nd Bn (Prince Albert Volunteers), The North Saskatchewan Regt	4th Bn, The North Saskatchewan Regt
1922	2nd Bn (53rd Bn, CEF), The North Saskatchewan Regt
1924	1st Bn (53rd Bn, CEF), The Prince Albert Volunteers	1st Bn (232nd Bn, CEF), The Battleford Light Infy
1932	Perpetuates Infy Coy, Battleford
1936	The Prince Albert and Battleford Volunteers
1941	The Prince Albert Volunteers
1942	1st Bn, The Prince Albert Volunteers, CASF	2nd (Reserve) Bn, The Prince Albert Volunteers
1945	Disbanded
The Battleford Light Infy (16th/22nd Saskatchewan Horse) (Reserve)
1946	The Prince Albert and Battleford Volunteers

== Regimental badge ==
The regimental badge was the head of an American bison, in quarter-profile facing the viewer's right, above a scroll with the regiment's name.

== Alliances ==
In 1927, the PAV became allied to the Bedfordshire and Hertfordshire Regiment in England.

== Battle honours ==
Nine battle honours from the Great War were granted to the regiment in 1930, in recognition of the service of soldiers recruited by the regiment. Bold type indicates honours authorized to be emblazoned on the regimental colour.

=== North West Rebellion ===
- **North West Canada, 1885**

=== The Great War ===
- Mount Sorrel
- **Somme, 1916**
- **Arras, 1917, '18**
- **Hill 70**
- **Ypres, 1917**
- **Amiens**
- **Hindenburg Line**
- **Pursuit to Mons**

== Notes and references ==
Other source:

- Light, Douglas W. (1987). Footprints in the Dust. North Battleford: Turner-Warwick Prineters Inc.
