= Saskatoon Light Infantry =

The Saskatoon Light Infantry
- Active: 1924–1955
- Country: Canada
- Branch: Canadian Militia (1924–1940); Canadian Army (1940–1955)
- Type: Light Infantry
- Role: Infantry
- Size: One Regiment
- Part of: Non-Permanent Active Militia (1924–1940); Royal Canadian Infantry Corps (1942–1955)
- Garrison/HQ: Saskatoon, Saskatchewan
- March: The Jockey of York
- Engagements: First World War; Second World War
- Battle honours: See #Battle honours

The Saskatoon Light Infantry was an infantry regiment of the Non-Permanent Active Militia of the Canadian Militia (now the Canadian Army). The regiment was formed in 1924, when The North Saskatchewan Regiment (1920–1924) was reorganized into four separate regiments. In 1955, the regiment was amalgamated with The Prince Albert and Battleford Volunteers to form The North Saskatchewan Regiment.

== Lineage ==
- Originated on 1 April 1912, in Saskatoon, Saskatchewan, as the 105th Regiment.
- Redesignated on 16 September 1912, as the 105th Regiment Fusiliers.
- Redesignated on 15 April 1914, as the 105th Regiment (Saskatoon Fusiliers).
- Amalgamated on 15 March 1920, with the 52nd Regiment Prince Albert Volunteers and redesignated as The North Saskatchewan Regiment.
- Reorganized on 15 May 1924, as four separate regiments: The Yorkton Regiment (now the 64th Field Battery, 10th Field Artillery Regiment, RCA), The Battleford Light Infantry, The Prince Albert Volunteers, and The Saskatoon Light Infantry.
- Amalgamated on 15 December 1936, with C Company of the 12th Machine Gun Battalion, CMGC (now The Royal Regina Rifles) and redesignated as The Saskatoon Light Infantry (Machine Gun).
- Redesignated on 7 November 1940, as the 2nd (Reserve) Battalion, The Saskatoon Light Infantry (Machine Gun).
- Redesignated on 1 November 1945, as The Saskatoon Light Infantry (Machine Gun).
- Amalgamated on 17 February 1955, with The Prince Albert and Battleford Volunteers (Machine Gun) to form the 2nd Battalion, The North Saskatchewan Regiment (The Saskatoon Light Infantry) (Machine Gun).
- Amalgamated on 1 September 1970, with the 1st Battalion, The North Saskatchewan Regiment (The Prince Albert and Battleford Volunteers) to form a single-battalion unit, The North Saskatchewan Regiment.

== Perpetuations ==
- 5th Battalion (Western Cavalry), CEF
- 65th Battalion (Saskatchewan), CEF

== History ==
=== Early history ===
On 15 May 1924, The North Saskatchewan Regiment was split up and reorganized into four separate regiments: The Saskatoon Light Infantry, The Yorkton Regiment (now the 64th Field Battery, RCA), The Prince Albert Volunteers and The Battleford Light Infantry.

On 15 December 1936, as a result of the 1936 Canadian Militia reorganization, The Saskatoon Light Infantry was amalgamated with C Company, 12th Machine Gun Battalion, CMGC and reorganized as a machine gun infantry battalion. As a result, the regiment was redesignated as The Saskatoon Light Infantry (Machine Gun).

=== Second World War ===
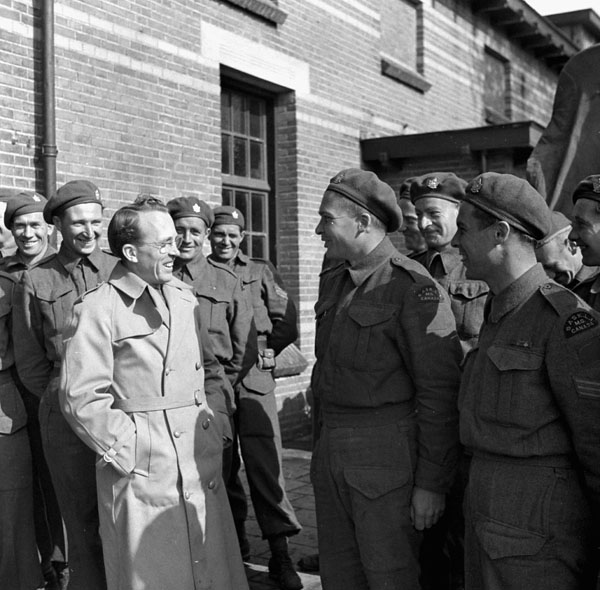
Premier of Saskatchewan Tommy Douglas, talking with Private P. Campbell of The Saskatoon Light Infantry (M.G.), in Barneveld, Netherlands, 1945.

==== Home front ====
On 26 August 1939, details of The Saskatoon Light Infantry (Machine Gun) were called out for service and on 1 September 1939, were placed on active service under the designation as The Saskatoon Light Infantry (Machine Gun), CASF for local protection duties. On 31 December 1940, those details on active service were disbanded.

==== Europe ====
On 1 September 1939, the regiment subsequently mobilized The Saskatoon Light Infantry (Machine Gun), CASF for active service, and on 8 December 1939, the battalion embarked for Great Britain as part of the 1st Canadian Infantry Division. On 7 November 1940, the battalion was again redesignated as the 1st Battalion, The Saskatoon Light Infantry (Machine Gun), CASF. On 25 August 1941, the battalion participated in the expedition to Spitzbergen, Norway. On 1 May 1943, the battalion was redesignated as the 1st Infantry Division Support Battalion (The Saskatoon Light Infantry), CIC, CASF. On 10 July 1943, the battalion as part of the 1st Canadian Infantry Division landed in Sicily as part of Operation Husky. On 3 September 1943, the battalion and the rest of the 1st Canadian Infantry Division as part of the British Army's V Corps landed in Italy where it fought as part of the Italian campaign, later joining with the rest of the 1st Canadian Infantry Division as part of the I Canadian Corps. On 1 July 1944, the battalion was again redesignated as the 1st Battalion, The Saskatoon Light Infantry (Machine Gun), CASF. On 4 March 1945, the battalion landed in France and upon arrival in the North West Europe theatre of operations with the rest of the First Canadian Army, it served until the end of the war. On 15 October 1945, the overseas battalion was disbanded.

==== Pacific ====
On 1 June 1945, The Saskatoon Light Infantry (Machine Gun) mobilized three “cannon” companies for active service with the 6th Canadian Infantry Division (Canadian Army Pacific Force). On 1 November 1945, these companies were disbanded.

== Organization ==
=== The Saskatoon Light Infantry (M.G.) (15 December 1936) ===
- Regimental HQ (Saskatoon)
- A Company (Saskatoon)
- B Company (Saskatoon)
- C Company (Melfort)
- D Company (Saskatoon)

== Alliances ==
United Kingdom - The King's Own Yorkshire Light Infantry (1925-1955)

== Uniform ==
Scarlet tunic with blue facings

Tartan: Mackenzie (pipers' kilts, 1942-1955, with permission of The Seaforth Highlanders of Canada)

== Battle honours ==
=== Great War ===
- Ypres, 1915, '17 (Note: Selected to be borne on colours and appointments)
- Gravenstafel
- St. Julien
- Festubert, 1915
- Mount Sorrel
- Somme, 1916
- Thiepval
- Ancre Heights
- Arras, 1917, '18
- Vimy, 1917
- Arleux
- Hill 70
- Passchendaele
- Amiens
- Scarpe, 1918
- Drocourt-Quéant
- Hindenburg Line
- Canal du Nord
- Pursuit to Mons
- France and Flanders, 1915–18

=== Second World War ===
- Landing in Sicily
- Valguarnera
- Agira
- Adrano
- Sicily, 1943
- The Gully
- Ortona
- Cassino II
- Gustav Line
- Liri Valley
- Hitler Line
- Gothic Line
- Lamone Crossing
- Rimini Line
- Cesena
- Savio Bridgehead
- Naviglio Canal
- Fosso Vecchio
- Fosso Munio
- Italy, 1943-1945
- Apeldoorn
- North-West Europe, 1945
