= 188th (Saskatchewan) Battalion, CEF =

The 188th (Saskatchewan) Battalion, CEF was a unit in the Canadian Expeditionary Force during the World War I. Based in Prince Albert, Saskatchewan, the unit began recruiting during the winter of 1915/16 throughout northern Saskatchewan. After sailing to England in October 1916, the battalion was absorbed into the 15th Reserve Battalion on January 4, 1917. The 188th (Saskatchewan) Battalion, CEF had one Officer Commanding: Lieutenant-Colonel S. J. Donaldson.
