= 65th Battalion (Saskatchewan), CEF =

Canadian infantry battalion

The 65th Battalion (Saskatchewan), CEF was an infantry battalion of the Canadian Expeditionary Force during the Great War. The 65th Battalion was authorized on 20 April 1915 and embarked for Great Britain on 18 June 1916. Its personnel were absorbed by the 44th Battalion (Manitoba), CEF, 46th Battalion (South Saskatchewan), CEF, 54th Battalion (Kootenay), CEF and 72nd Battalion (Seaforth Highlanders of Canada), CEF of the 4th Canadian Division on 30 June 1916. The battalion was disbanded on 12 October 1917.

The 65th Battalion recruited in Saskatoon and Prince Albert, Saskatchewan and Winnipeg, Manitoba and was mobilized at Saskatoon.

The 65th Battalion was commanded by Lt.-Col. N. Lang from 20 July 1916 to 25 September 1916.

The 65th Battalion was awarded the battle honour THE GREAT WAR 1916.

The 65th Battalion (Saskatchewan), CEF is perpetuated by The North Saskatchewan Regiment.

== Sources ==
- Canadian Expeditionary Force 1914-1919 by Col. G.W.L. Nicholson, CD, Queen's Printer, Ottawa, Ontario, 1962
