= South Saskatchewan Regiment (1920–1924) =

The South Saskatchewan Regiment
- Active: 1920-1924
- Country: Canada
- Branch: Canadian Militia
- Type: Line infantry
- Role: Infantry
- Size: 10 battalions
- Part of: Non-Permanent Active Militia
- Garrison/HQ: Regina, Saskatchewan
- Engagements: First World War

The South Saskatchewan Regiment was a short-lived infantry regiment of the Non-Permanent Active Militia of the Canadian Militia (now the Canadian Army). In 1924, the regiment was reorganized and split up into 5 separate regiments.

== Lineage ==
=== 95th Saskatchewan Rifles ===
- Originated on 3 July 1905, in Regina, Saskatchewan, as a regiment of infantry in the districts of Assiniboia and Saskatchewan.
- Redesignated on 2 April 1907, as the 95th Regiment and converted to a rifle regiment on 1 May 1908.
- Redesignated on 1 June 1909, as the 95th Saskatchewan Rifles.
- Reorganized on 1 April 1912, into two separate regiments: the 95th Saskatchewan Rifles and the 105th Regiment (now The North Saskatchewan Regiment).
- Amalgamated on 15 March 1920, with the 60th Rifles of Canada and redesignated as The South Saskatchewan Regiment.

=== 60th Rifles of Canada ===
- Originated on 2 January 1913, in Moose Jaw, Saskatchewan, as the 60th Rifles of Canada.
- Amalgamated on 15 March 1920, with the 95th Saskatchewan Rifles redesignated as The South Saskatchewan Regiment.

== Perpetuations ==
- 28th Battalion (Northwest), CEF
- 46th Battalion (South Saskatchewan), CEF
- 68th Battalion (Regina), CEF
- 128th (Moose Jaw) Battalion, CEF
- 195th (City of Regina) Battalion, CEF

== History ==
=== 95th Saskatchewan Rifles ===
On 3 July 1905, the 95th Regiment was authorized for service in the districts of Assiniboia and Saskatchewan. The regiment had its Headquarters in Regina and companies at Moose Jaw, Regina, Wolseley, Saskatoon and Prince Albert, Saskatchewan. On 1 May 1908, the regiment was converted to a rifle regiment. On 1 June 1909, the regiment was Redesignated as the 95th Saskatchewan Rifles.

On 1 April 1912, the regiment was Reorganized to form two regiments: the 95th Saskatchewan Rifles and the 105th Regiment (now The North Saskatchewan Regiment).

=== 60th Rifles of Canada ===
On 2 January 1913, the 60th Rifles of Canada was authorized for service with its Headquarters at Moose Jaw.

=== The Great War ===
On 6 August 1914, Details of both the 60th Rifles of Canada and the 95th Saskatchewan Rifles were placed on active service for local protective duty.

On 7 November 1914, the 28th Battalion (Northwest), CEF was authorized for service and on 29 May 1915, the battalion embarked for Great Britain. On 18 September 1915, the 28th Battalion disembarked in France where it fought as part of the 6th Canadian Brigade, 2nd Canadian Division in France and Flanders until the end of the war. On 30 August 1920, the 28th Battalion, CEF was disbanded.

On 7 November 1914, the 46th Battalion (South Saskatchewan), CEF was authorized for service and on 23 October 1915, the battalion embarked for Great Britain. On 11 August 1916, the 46th Battalion disembarked in France where it fought with the 10th Canadian Brigade, 4th Canadian Division in France and Flanders until the end of the war. On 30 August 1920, the 46th Battalion, CEF was disbanded.

On 20 April 1915, the 68th Battalion (Regina), CEF was authorized for service and on 28 April 1916, the battalion embarked for Great Britain. After its arrival in the UK, the battalion provided reinforcements for the Canadian Corps in the field. On 6 July 1916, the battalion's personnel were absorbed by the 32nd Battalion, CEF. On 21 May 1917, the 68th Battalion, CEF was disbanded.

On 22 December 1915, the 128th (Moose Jaw) Battalion, CEF was authorized for service and on 15 August 1916, the battalion embarked for Great Britain. After its arrival in the UK, the battalion provided reinforcements for the Canadian Corps in the field. On 13 February 1917, the 128th Battalion was allotted to the 13th Canadian Brigade, 5th Canadian Division in England. On 27 May 1917, the battalion's personnel were absorbed by the 19th Reserve Battalion, CEF. On 30 August 1920, the 128th Battalion, CEF was disbanded.

On 15 July 1916, the 195th (City of Regina) Battalion, CEF was authorized for service and on 31 October 1916, the battalion embarked for Great Britain. After its arrival in the UK, on 12 November 1916, the battalion's personnel were absorbed by the 32nd Battalion, CEF to provide reinforcements for the Canadian Corps in the field. On 27 July 1918, 195th Battalion, CEF was disbanded.

=== The South Saskatchewan Regiment ===
On 15 March 1920, as a result of the Otter Commission and the following Reorganization of the Canadian Militia, The South Saskatchewan Regiment was formed by the Amalgamation of the 95th Saskatchewan Rifles and the 60th Rifles of Canada.

This amalgamation would be short lived however as on 15 May 1924, The South Saskatchewan Regiment was split up and reorganized into 5 separate regiments: The South Saskatchewan Regiment (Redesignated on 15 September 1924, as The King's Own Rifles of Canada - now The Saskatchewan Dragoons), The Assiniboia Regiment (now the 10th Field Artillery Regiment, RCA), The Regina Rifle Regiment (now The Royal Regina Rifles), The Weyburn Regiment and The Saskatchewan Border Regiment.

== Organization ==
=== The South Saskatchewan Regiment (15 March 1920) ===
- 1st Battalion (Regina, SK)
- 2nd Battalion (Moose Jaw, SK)
- 3rd Battalion (Weyburn, SK)
- 4th Battalion (Moosomin, SK)
- 5th Battalion (Estevan, SK)

=== The South Saskatchewan Regiment (1 October 1920) ===
- 1st Battalion (Regina, SK) (perpetuating the 28th Battalion, CEF)
- 2nd Battalion (Moose Jaw, SK) (perpetuating the 46th Battalion, CEF)
- 3rd Battalion (Weyburn, SK)
- 4th Battalion (Moosomin, SK)
- 5th Battalion (Estevan, SK)
- 6th (Reserve) Battalion (perpetuating the 68th Battalion, CEF)
- 7th (Reserve) Battalion (perpetuating the 128th Battalion, CEF)
- 8th (Reserve) Battalion (perpetuating the 195th Battalion, CEF)
- 9th (Reserve) Battalion
- 10th (Reserve) Battalion
