= Saskatchewan Border Regiment =

The Saskatchewan Border Regiment
- Active: 1924-1936
- Country: Canada
- Branch: Canadian Militia
- Type: Line infantry
- Role: Infantry
- Size: One regiment
- Part of: Non-Permanent Active Militia
- Garrison/HQ: Estevan, Saskatchewan
- Engagements: First World War
- Battle honours: Arras, 1917; Hill 70

The Saskatchewan Border Regiment was an infantry regiment of the Non-Permanent Active Militia of the Canadian Militia (now the Canadian Army). The regiment was created in 1924 in Estevan, Saskatchewan, from the reorganization of The South Saskatchewan Regiment into five separate regiments. In 1936, The Saskatchewan Border Regiment was amalgamated with The Weyburn Regiment to re-form The South Saskatchewan Regiment.

== History ==
The Saskatchewan Border Regiment originated as the 95th Regiment on July 3, 1905, with headquarters in Regina. A Company and B Company of the 95th Regiment were designated the 60th Rifles of Canada during World War I. On August 6, 1914, troops from the 95th Saskatchewan Rifles and the 60th Rifles of Canada were placed on active service, contributing officers and other ranks to the 46th Battalion, Canadian Expeditionary Force (CEF), throughout World War I.

On March 15, 1920, as a result of the Canadian Militia reforms following the Otter Commission, the 95th Saskatchewan Rifles were amalgamated with the 60th Rifles of Canada and was renamed The South Saskatchewan Regiment.

On 15 May 1924, The South Saskatchewan Regiment was reorganized into five separate regiments: The Regina Rifle Regiment, The Assiniboia Regiment (now the 10th Field Artillery Regiment, RCA), The Weyburn Regiment, The Saskatchewan Border Regiment, and The South Saskatchewan Regiment (later redesignated on 15 September 1924, as The King's Own Rifles of Canada and now The Saskatchewan Dragoons).

On 15 December 1936, as a result of the 1936 Canadian Militia reorganization, The Saskatchewan Border Regiment was amalgamated with The Weyburn Regiment to form The South Saskatchewan Regiment.

The South Saskatchewan Regiment later went on to serve as part of the 2nd Canadian Infantry Division during the Second World War, most notably during the Dieppe Raid of August 1942 and later during the Normandy Campaign of 1944.

== Perpetuations ==
- 152nd Battalion, CEF

== Organization ==
The Saskatchewan Border Regiment had its regimental headquarters at Estevan, Saskatchewan, and companies at Estevan, Carnduff, Lampman and Neptune.

== Alliances ==
Until 1936, The Saskatchewan Border Regiment was allied to The Border Regiment.

== Battle honours ==
=== The Great War ===
- Arras, 1917
- Hill 70

== Media ==
- The March of the Prairie Men. A Story of the South Saskatchewan Regiment by Lt. Col. G. B. Buchanan (1900)
