= King's Own Rifles =

King's Own Rifles may refer to:

- King's Royal Rifle Corps, a British Army infantry regiment
- The King's Own Rifles of Canada, a Canadian Army infantry regiment now named The Saskatchewan Dragoons.
