= Saskatchewan Dragoons =

The Saskatchewan Dragoons
- The Saskatchewan Dragoons badge
- Active: 1913–present
- Country: Canada
- Branch: Canadian Army
- Type: Armoured reconnaissance
- Size: One squadron
- Part of: 38 Canadian Brigade Group
- Garrison/HQ: LCol D.V. Currie, VC Armoury, Moose Jaw, Saskatchewan
- Motto: Esprit d'initiative (French for 'spirit of initiative')
- March: "Punjaub"
- Engagements: First World War; Second World War; War in Afghanistan
- Battle honours: Mount Sorrel; Somme, 1916; Ancre Heights; Ancre, 1916; Arras, 1917, 1918; Vimy, 1917; Hill 70; Ypres, 1917; Passchendaele; Amiens; Scarpe, 1918; Drocourt–Quéant; Hindenburg Line; Canal du Nord; Valenciennes; France and Flanders, 1916–1918; Afghanistan
- Website: army-armee.forces.gc.ca/en/3-canadian-division/the-saskatchewan-dragoons/index.page

Commanders
- Colonel-in-Chief: Prince Edward, Duke of Edinburgh

Insignia
- NATO Map Symbol

- NATO Map Symbol

The Saskatchewan Dragoons is a Primary Reserve armoured regiment of the Canadian Army. The unit is based in Moose Jaw. Their primary job is to assist the Regular Force in meeting Canada's military commitments. Their training and equipment closely follow that of the Regular Force, which the Reserves are called upon to assist increasingly often. The Saskatchewan Dragoons are part of 3rd Canadian Division's 38 Canadian Brigade Group.

Prince Edward, Earl of Wessex became colonel-in-chief of the regiment on visiting Saskatchewan in 2003, when he congratulated the regiment on its "contribution to Canada's proud tradition of citizen-soldiers in the community". Involved in peacekeeping operations in Cyprus, the Golan Heights, Bosnia and Croatia, members of the regiment have also provided aid during floods and forest fires in the prairies.

== Role ==
Their role is that of a reconnaissance squadron. They examine an area in preparation for the advance of a main body of troops. They go forward, sometimes many miles, and gather information on enemy strength, equipment, movements, and intentions. They pass this information, together with other helpful information on such things as bridges, blocked roads, and areas of potential danger, back to higher command so the advance can take place as safely as possible. At the same time they deny such information to the enemy. In the withdrawal, they maintain contact with the enemy while the main body pulls back. Thus, they often speak of their role as "first in last out".

== Lineage ==
=== The Saskatchewan Dragoons ===
The Saskatchewan Dragoons originated in Regina, Saskatchewan on 3 July 1905, when a regiment of infantry was authorized to be formed in the districts of Assiniboia and Saskatchewan.

It was designated the 95th Regiment on 2 April 1907 and the 95th Saskatchewan Rifles on 1 June 1909.

On 1 April 1912 the regiment was reorganized as two separate regiments, the 105th Regiment (now The North Saskatchewan Regiment) and the 95th Saskatchewan Rifles.

On 15 March 1920, it was amalgamated with the 60th Rifles of Canada and redesignated The South Saskatchewan Regiment.

On 15 May 1924, The South Saskatchewan Regiment was reorganized into five separate regiments, The Assiniboia Regiment (now the 10th Field Artillery Regiment, RCA), The Regina Rifle Regiment (now The Royal Regina Rifles), The Weyburn Regiment (now The South Saskatchewan Regiment), The Saskatchewan Border Regiment (now The South Saskatchewan Regiment) and The South Saskatchewan Regiment.

It was redesignated The King's Own Rifles of Canada on 15 September 1924.

On 15 December 1936, it was amalgamated with B Company of the 12th Machine Gun Battalion, CMGC (now The Royal Regina Rifles) and redesignated The King's Own Rifles of Canada (MG).

It was redesignated the 2nd Battalion, The King's Own Rifles of Canada on 29 January 1942 and, upon conversion to armour, the 20th (Saskatchewan) Armoured Regiment, RCAC, on 1 April 1946, the 20th Saskatchewan Armoured Regiment on 4 February 1949, The Saskatchewan Dragoons (20th Armoured Regiment) on 31 July 1954 and The Saskatchewan Dragoons on 19 May 1958.

The Saskatchewan Dragoons were restricted to one squadron on 1 September 1970.

=== Lineage chart ===
Lineage chart

1913	60th Rifles of Canada
1914	46th Bn, CEF
1915	128th "Overseas" Bn, CEF
1917	Absorbed by 19th Reserve Bn
1920	Disbanded	2nd Bn (46th Bn, CEF), The South Saskatchewan Regt	4th Bn (128th Bn, CEF), (Note: Reserve) The South Saskatchewan Regt
1920	7th Bn (128th Bn, CEF), The South Saskatchewan Regt
1924	1st Bn, The South Saskatchewan Regt	2nd Bn, The South Saskatchewan Regt
1924	1st Bn (46th Bn, CEF), The King’s Own Rifles of Canada	2nd Bn (128th Bn, CEF), The King’s Own Rifles of Canada
B Coy, 12th MG Bn, CMGC
1936	The King’s Own Rifles of Canada (MG)	Disbanded
1942	1st Bn, The King's Own Rifles of Canada, CASF	2nd Bn, The King's Own Rifles of Canada
1946	Disbanded	20th (Saskatchewan) Armd Regt, RCAC
1949	20th Saskatchewan Armd Regt
1954	The Saskatchewan Dragoons (20th Armd Regt)
1958	The Saskatchewan Dragoons

== Perpetuations ==
The Saskatchewan Dragoons perpetuate the 46th Battalion (South Saskatchwewan), CEF and the 128th Battalion (Moose Jaw), CEF.

== Operational history ==
The camp flag of The Saskatchewan Dragoons.

=== Great War ===
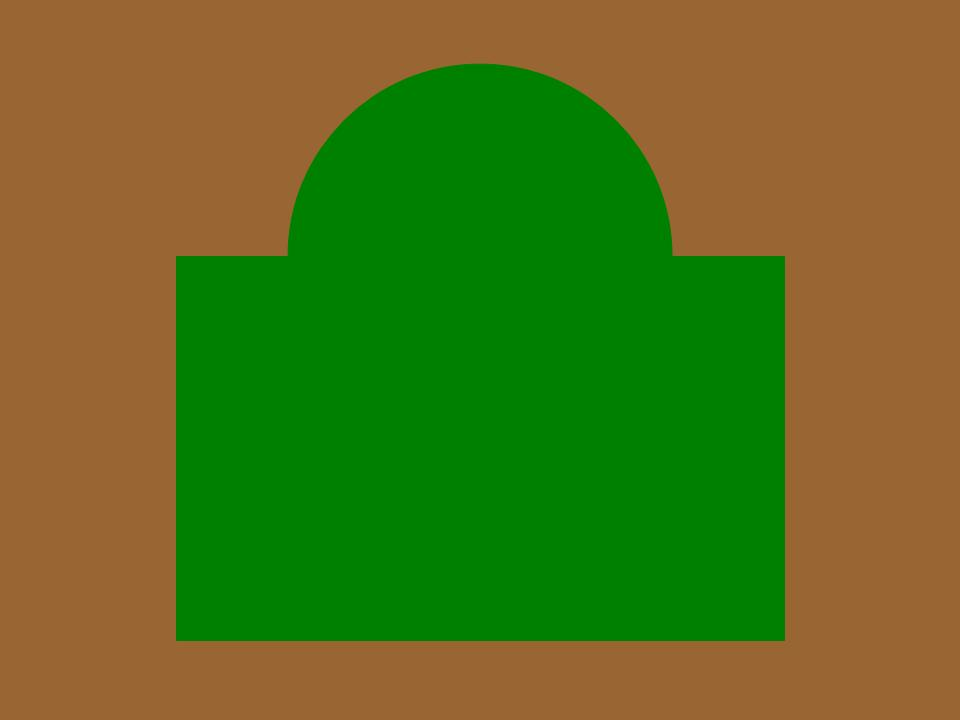
The distinguishing patch of the 46th Battalion (South Saskatchewan), CEF.

Details of the 60th Rifles of Canada and the 95th Saskatchewan Rifles were placed on active service on 6 August 1914 for local protective duty.

The 46th Battalion (South Saskatchewan), CEF, was authorized on 7 November 1914 and embarked for Britain on 23 October 1915, disembarking in France on 11 August 1916, where it fought as part of the 10th Infantry Brigade, 4th Canadian Division in France and Flanders until the end of the war. The battalion was disbanded on 30 August 1920.

Sgt Hugh Cairns of the 46th Battalion (South Saskatchewan), CEF, was posthumously awarded the Victoria Cross for his actions at Valenciennes, destroying several enemy machine gun positions and capturing numerous enemy soldiers over the course of several engagements on 1 November 1918. He was severely wounded while disarming a party of 60 German soldiers he had forced to surrender and died of his wounds the next day.

The 128th Battalion (Moose Jaw), CEF, was authorized on 22 December 1915 and embarked for Britain on 15 August 1916, where it provided reinforcements to the Canadian Corps in the field until 13 February 1917, when it was allotted to the 13th Infantry Brigade, 5th Canadian Division in England. On 27 May 1917 its personnel were absorbed by the 19th Reserve Battalion, CEF. The battalion was disbanded on 30 August 1920.

=== Second World War ===
The regiment mobilized the 1st Battalion, The King's Own Rifles of Canada, CASF, on 29 January 1942. The unit served in Canada in a home defence role as part of the 14th Canadian Infantry Brigade, 8th Canadian Infantry Division. The battalion was disbanded on 30 March 1946.

== Battle honours ==
The guidon of The Saskatchewan Dragoons.

Those battle honours in bold type are emblazoned on the regiment's guidon.

=== Great War ===
- MOUNT SORREL
- **SOMME, 1916**
- Ancre Heights
- **Ancre, 1916**
- ARRAS, 1917, 1918
- **Vimy, 1917**
- **HILL 70**
- **YPRES, 1917**
- **Passchendaele**
- **AMIENS**
- Scarpe, 1918
- **Drocourt-Quéant**
- HINDENBURG LINE
- **Canal du Nord**
- **VALENCIENNES**
- FRANCE AND FLANDERS, 1916-18

=== War in Afghanistan ===
- AFGHANISTAN

== Armoury ==
Site	Date(s)	Designated	Location	Description	Image
Colonel D. V. Currie VC Armoury, 1215 Main Street North,	1913-14	1998 Register of the Government of Canada Heritage Buildings	Moose Jaw, Saskatchewan	large, low-massed brick structure in the north end of Moose Jaw in a mixed commercial, recreational and residential neighbourhood.; Currently the home of the Saskatchewan Dragoons; it has housed 95th Saskatchewan Rifles, the 60th Rifles, the King’s Own Rifles of Canada, the 77th Battery, Royal Canadian Artillery, the 19th Medical Company, Royal Canadian Army Medical Corps, and the 142nd Transport Company, Royal Canadian Army Service Corps	

== Order of precedence ==
Preceded by The South Alberta Light Horse	The Saskatchewan Dragoons	Succeeded by The King's Own Calgary Regiment (RCAC)
