= Suicide pill =

Method of suicide

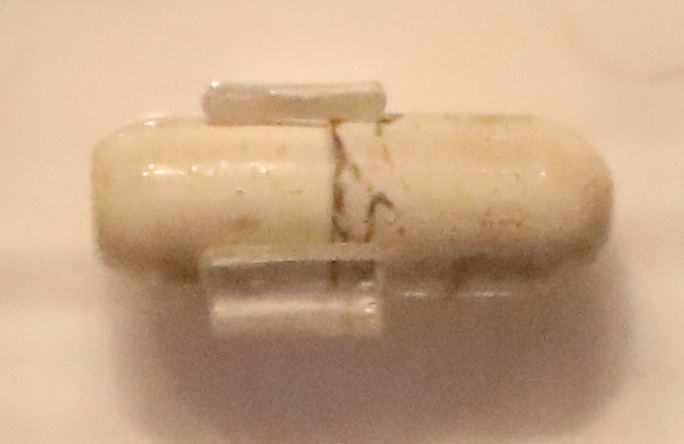
Special Operations Executive suicide pill from World War II

A suicide pill (also known as the cyanide pill, kill-pill, lethal pill, death-pill, cyanide capsule, or L-pill) is a pill, capsule, ampoule, or tablet containing a fatally poisonous substance that a person ingests deliberately to achieve death quickly through suicide. Military and espionage organizations have provided their agents in danger of being captured by the enemy with suicide pills and devices which can be used to avoid an imminent and far more unpleasant death (such as through torture), or to ensure that they cannot be interrogated and forced to disclose secret information. As a result, lethal pills have important psychological value to persons carrying out missions with a high risk of capture and interrogation.

The term "poison pill" is also used colloquially for a policy or legal action set up by an institution that has fatal or highly unpleasant consequences for that institution if a certain event occurs. Examples include the so-called "poison pill" clauses inserted in corporate charters as a takeover defence, and wrecking amendments added to legislative bills.

== History ==
=== Description ===
During World War II, British and American secret services developed the "L-pill" (lethal pill), which was given to agents going behind enemy lines. It was an oval capsule, approximately the size of a pea, consisting of a thin-walled glass ampoule covered in brown rubber to protect against accidental breakage and filled with a concentrated solution of potassium cyanide. To use, the agent bites down on the pill, crushing the ampoule to release the fast-acting poison. The heartbeat quickly stops and brain death occurs within minutes.

After the war, the L-pill was offered to pilots of the U-2 reconnaissance plane, who were in danger of being shot down and captured flying over Eastern Europe, but most pilots declined to take it with them.

The Central Intelligence Agency began experimenting with saxitoxin, an extremely potent neurotoxin, during the 1950s as a replacement for the L-pill. According to CIA Director William Colby, a tiny saxitoxin-impregnated needle hidden inside a fake silver dollar was issued to Francis Gary Powers, an American U-2 pilot who was shot down while flying over the USSR in May 1960.

According to former CIA Chief of Disguise Jonna Mendez, the CIA hid poison pills in several items, including the caps of pens and the frames of glasses. Operatives would bite down, and the poison concealed inside would be released.

=== Examples ===
- Special Operations Executive agents aiding the Cretan resistance usually carried grey rubber suicide pills, which were known as "cough drops." The agents typically had them sewn into the corners of shirt collars, so they could bite down on them if need be. According to Sandy Rendel, one such agent, the pills contained cyanide and would kill in "a matter of minutes" if sucked and "'very painfully' three to four hours later" if swallowed.
- One of the objectives of the Dieppe Raid in August 1942 was to discover the importance and performance capability of a German radar station on the cliff-top to the east of the French town of Pourville. To achieve this, RAF Flight Sergeant Jack Nissenthall, a radar specialist, was attached to the South Saskatchewan Regiment. He was to attempt to enter the radar station and learn its secrets, accompanied by a small unit of 11 men of the Saskatchewans as bodyguards. Nissenthall volunteered for the mission fully aware that, due to the highly sensitive nature of his knowledge of Allied radar technology, his Saskatchewan bodyguard unit was under orders to kill him if necessary to prevent him being captured. He also carried a cyanide pill as a last resort.
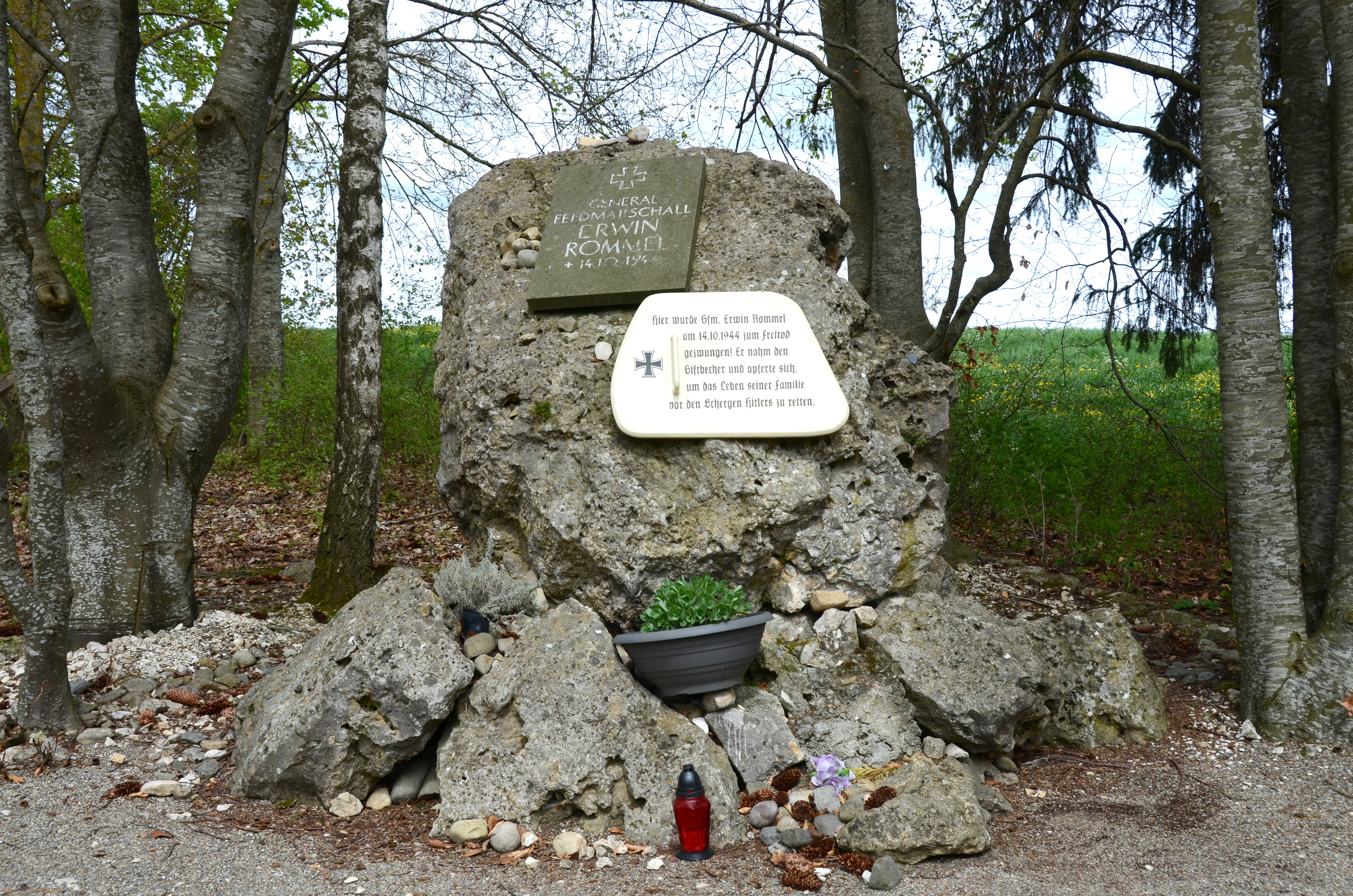
- Erwin Rommel Memorial, place of his suicide with a cyanide pill, Herrlingen (2019)
  German field marshal Erwin Rommel was forced to commit suicide with a cyanide pill following his implication in the plot of July 20, 1944 against Hitler.
- At the end of World War II, Hitler's wife Eva Braun and several leading Nazis, such as Heinrich Himmler and Philipp Bouhler, killed themselves using lethal pills containing a solution of cyanide salts.
- Also at the end of World War II, Hermann Göring, one of the most influential Nazi leaders after Hitler, committed suicide with a cyanide pill he smuggled into his cell the night before his scheduled execution.
- On June 22, 1977, Aleksandr Ogorodnik, a CIA operative working in the USSR, was captured by the KGB. He offered to write his confession, but said he would only do it with his pen, so that he could bite down on the cap, which had an ampoule of lethal poison concealed inside it. According to the Russian agent interrogating him, he was dead before he hit the floor.
- In 1985, serial killer Leonard Lake killed himself using cyanide pills sewn into his clothes after he was arrested for possessing a suppressor and an unregistered handgun, knowing that further investigation into his life would uncover his more serious crimes.
- In 1987, two North Korean agents bit into ampoules hidden in the filter tips of cigarettes after they were detained in Bahrain as suspects in an airplane bombing. One agent died.
- During the Sri Lankan civil war, between 1987 and 2009, the suicide bombers of the Tamil Tigers wore a potassium cyanide necklace. If they were captured by the Sri Lanka Army, they would bite into the tablet at the end of the necklace. In addition to suicide bombers, since 1976, almost all Tamil Tigers of the LTTE wore suicide pills. This is the most recent, wide-scale use of potassium cyanide as a suicide tool. The women were the most publicized, carrying a tablet adhered to their tooth.

==== Space travel ====
One urban legend suggests that American astronauts could carry suicide pills in case they are unable to return to Earth. It is possible this myth was started by the movie Contact, in a scene where the main character is given suicide pills in case she cannot get back to Earth. This was disputed by astronaut Jim Lovell, who co-wrote Lost Moon (later renamed Apollo 13). On the DVD director's commentary, it was asserted that because marooned astronauts could easily commit suicide by simply venting the air from their spacecraft or suits, such a pill would not likely be necessary.

Cosmonaut Alexei Leonov stated that the Soviet space program gave him a suicide pill for use if he could not reenter Voskhod 2 after his March 1965 spacewalk.

== Metaphorical uses ==
In economics, a suicide pill is a form of risk arbitrage used by corporations to commit suicide during hostile takeover attempts. As an extreme version of the "poison pill" defense, this crippling provision refers to any technique used by a target firm in which takeover protection could result in self-destruction. Variations include the Jonestown defense, the scorched-earth defense, and the golden parachute.

In legislative debate, a wrecking amendment may be called a "poison pill amendment".
