= 10th Field Artillery Regiment, RCA =

- Active: 1905–present
- Country: Canada
- Branch: Canadian Army
- Type: Field artillery
- Role: Artillery
- Size: 2 batteries
- Part of: Royal Regiment of Canadian Artillery
- Garrison/HQ: Regina, Saskatchewan
- Motto(s): Ubique (Latin for 'Everywhere'). Quo fas et gloria ducunt (Latin for 'Whither right and glory lead')
- March: Quick: "British Grenadiers"

The 10th Field Artillery Regiment, RCA is an artillery regiment of the Canadian Army Primary Reserve. Based in Regina, Saskatchewan, the regiment forms part of the 38 Canadian Brigade Group of the 3rd Canadian Division.

== History ==
Part of the regiment's history can be traced to the Assiniboia Regiment, established in July 1905, later becoming the 95th Saskatchewan Regiment. The Assiniboia Regiment was garrisoned at Moosomin, Saskatchewan.

=== The Great War ===
On 6 August 1914, details from the 29th Light Horse, the 60th Rifles of Canada and the 95th Saskatchewan Regiment were placed on active service for local protection duties.

On 1 January 1916, the 10th Brigade, CFA, CEF was authorized for service. On 26 February 1916, the brigade embarked for Great Britain. On 14 July 1916, the 10th Brigade, CFA, disembarked in France where it fired its guns as part of the 3rd Canadian Divisional Artillery in France and Flanders until the end of the war on 11 November 1918. On 23 October 1920, the 10th Brigade, CFA was disbanded.

On 15 July 1916, the 217th Battalion, CEF was authorized for service. On 2 June 1917, the battalion embarked for Great Britain. After arrival in the UK, on 9 June 1917, the battalion's personnel were absorbed by the 19th Reserve Battalion, CEF to provide reinforcements for the Canadian Corps in the field. On 1 September 1917, the 217th Battalion was disbanded.

On 15 July 1916, the 67th Depot Battery, CFA, CEF, was authorized for service. The battery served as a depot unit in Canada until 2 October 1918, when its personnel were absorbed by the No. 2 Artillery Depot, CEF. On 23 October 1920, the 67th Depot Battery, CFA was disbanded.

Through the 217th Battalion, the Assiniboia Regiment was awarded two battle honours:

- Amiens
- Arras, 1918

Until its conversion into artillery in 1936 the Assiniboia Regiment perpetuated the 217th Battalion, CEF.

=== Second World War ===
On 24 May 1941, the 67th (Rosetown) Field Battery mobilized the 67th (Rosetown) Light Anti-Aircraft Battery, RCA, CASF, for service. The battery provided light anti-aircraft artillery support as part of the 7th Light Anti-Aircraft Regiment, RCA, CASF, while based in Great Britain. On 1 March 1944, the 67th (Rosetown) Light Anti-Aircraft Battery, RCA, was disbanded.

Today the 10th Field Artillery Regiment RCA includes the 18th Field Battery, RCA (Regina, Saskatchewan) and the 64th Field Battery, RCA (Yorkton, Saskatchewan).

== Lineage ==
=== 10th Field Artillery Regiment, RCA ===
- Originated on 2 February 1920, in Regina, Saskatchewan, as the 10th Brigade, CFA.
- Redesignated on 1 July 1925, as the 10th Field Brigade, CA.
- Redesignated on 3 June 1935, as the 10th Field Brigade, RCA.
- Redesignated on 7 November 1940, as the 10th (Reserve) Field Brigade, RCA.
- Redesignated on 15 March 1943, as the 10th (Reserve) Field Regiment, RCA.
- Redesignated on 1 April 1946, as the 10th Medium Regiment, RCA.
- Amalgamated on 2 August 1954, with the 22nd Field Regiment, RCA, the 44th Light Anti-Aircraft Battery, RCA (redesignated 44th Medium Battery, RCA), and the 67th Light Anti-Aircraft Battery, RCA, retaining the same designation.
- Redesignated on 12 April 1960, as the 10th Medium Artillery Regiment, RCA.
- The 44th Medium Battery, RCA ceased its amalgamation with the regiment on 30 October 1961.
- Redesignated on 1 May 1962, as the 10th Field Artillery Regiment, RCA.

=== The Assiniboia Regiment / 22nd Field Regiment, RCA ===
- Originated on 3 July 1905, as a regiment of infantry in the districts of Assiniboia and Saskatchewan.
- Redesignated on 2 April 1907, as the 95th Regiment and converted to a rifle regiment on 1 May 1908.
- Redesignated on 1 June 1909, as the 95th Saskatchewan Rifles.
- Reorganized on 1 April 1912, into two separate regiments: the 95th (Saskatchewan) Regiment and the 105th Regiment (now The North Saskatchewan Regiment).
- Amalgamated on 15 March 1920, with the 60th Rifles of Canada and redesignated as The South Saskatchewan Regiment.
- Reorganized on 15 May 1924, into five regiments: The Weyburn Regiment, The Saskatchewan Border Regiment, The Regina Rifle Regiment, The South Saskatchewan Regiment (now The Saskatchewan Dragoons) and The Assiniboia Regiment.
- The Assiniboia Regiment converted to artillery on 1 December 1936, and redesignated as the 22nd (Assiniboia) Field Brigade, RCA.
- Redesignated on 7 November 1940, as the 22nd (Reserve) (Assiniboia) Field Brigade, RCA.
- Redesignated on 15 March 1943, as the 22nd (Reserve) (Assiniboia) Field Regiment, RCA.
- Redesignated on 1 April 1946, as the 22nd Field Regiment, RCA.
- Amalgamated on 2 August 1954, with the 10th Field Regiment, RCA, the 44th Light Anti-Aircraft Battery, RCA, and the 67th Light Anti-Aircraft Battery, RCA, and redesignated as the 10th Field Regiment, RCA.

=== 18th Canadian Light Horse / 67th Light Anti-Aircraft Battery, RCA ===
- Originated on 1 April 1911, in Saskatoon, Saskatchewan, as the 29th Light Horse.
- Redesignated on 15 March 1920, as the 18th Canadian Light Horse.
- Amalgamated on 15 December 1936, with the 67th Field Battery, RCA, and redesignated as the 67th (Rosetown) Field Battery, RCA.
- Redesignated on 7 November 1940, as the 67th (Reserve) (Rosetown) Field Battery, RCA.
- Redesignated on 1 April 1946, as the 67th Light Anti-Aircraft Battery, RCA.
- Amalgamated on 2 August 1954, with the 10th Medium Regiment, RCA, the 22nd Field Regiment, RCA, and the 44th Light Anti-Aircraft Battery, RCA.

=== 67th Field Battery, RCA ===
- Originated on 2 February 1920, in Rosetown, Saskatchewan, as the 67th Battery, CFA.
- Redesignated on 1 July 1925, as the 67th Field Battery, CA.
- Redesignated on 3 June 1935, as the 67th Field Battery, RCA.
- Amalgamated on 15 December 1936, with the 18th Canadian Light Horse retaining its former designation. Prior to this amalgamation, the 67th Battery had existed only on paper, having been authorized in 1920 but never organized.

=== Chart ===
Lineage chart

1911
1912
1913
1916 | 10th Bde, CFA, CEF
1917
1918
1920 | Disbanded
1920 | 10th Bde, CFA
1924
1925 | 10th Fd Bde, CA
1935 | 10th Fd Bde, RCA
1936
1940 | 10th (Reserve) Fd Bde, RCA
1941
1943 | 10th (Reserve) Fd Regt, RCA
1944
1946 | 10th Medium Regt, RCA
1954
1960
1962

29th Light Horse
217th "Overseas" Bn, CEF | 67th "Overseas" Depot Bty, CEF
Absorbed by 19th Reserve Bn
Absorbed by No. 2 Arty Depot
4th Bn, The South Saskatchewan Regt | 18th Canadian Light Horse | 67th Bty, CFA (Note: Authorized but not organized)
1st Bn (217th Bn, CEF), The Assiniboia Regt
67th Fd Bty, CA
67th Fd Bty, RCA
22nd (Assiniboia) Fd Bde, RCA | 67th (Rosetown) Fd Bty, RCA (Note: 17th Field Brigade, RCA)
22nd (Reserve) (Assiniboia) Fd Bde, RCA | 67th (Reserve) (Rosetown) Fd Bty, RCA (Note: 17th (Reserve) Field Brigade, RCA)
67th (Rosetown) Light Anti-Aircraft Bty, RCA, CASF (Note: 7th Light Anti-Aircraft Regiment, RCA, CASF)
22nd (Reserve) (Assiniboia) Fd Regt, RCA
Disbanded
22nd Fd Regt, RCA | 67th Light Anti-Aircraft Bty, RCA (Note: 17th Light Anti-Aircraft Regiment, RCA)
10th Medium Regt, RCA
10th Medium Arty Regt, RCA
10th Fd Arty Regt, RCA

== Perpetuations ==
- 10th Brigade, CFA, CEF
- 217th (Qu'Appelle) Battalion, CEF
- 67th Depot Battery, CFA, CEF
