= Hugh Cairns =

Hugh Cairns may refer to:

- Hugh Cairns, 1st Earl Cairns (1819–1885), Lord Chancellor of the United Kingdom twice
- Sir Hugh Cairns (surgeon) (1896–1952), Australian surgeon
- Hugh Cairns (VC) (1896–1918), Canadian recipient of the Victoria Cross in 1918
