= Weyburn Regiment =

The Weyburn Regiment
- Active: 1924–1936
- Country: Canada
- Branch: Canadian Militia
- Type: Line infantry
- Part of: Non-Permanent Active Militia
- Garrison/HQ: Weyburn, Saskatchewan
- Engagements: First World War
- Battle honours: Arras, 1917; Hill 70

The Weyburn Regiment was an infantry regiment of the Non-Permanent Active Militia of the Canadian Militia (now the Canadian Army). The regiment was created in 1924 in Weyburn, Saskatchewan, from the reorganization of The South Saskatchewan Regiment into five separate regiments. In 1936, The Weyburn Regiment was amalgamated with The Saskatchewan Border Regiment to re-form The South Saskatchewan Regiment.

== History ==
On March 15, 1920, as a result of the Canadian Militia reforms following the Otter Commission, the 95th Saskatchewan Rifles amalgamated with the 60th Rifles of Canada and was renamed as The South Saskatchewan Regiment.

On 15 May 1924, The South Saskatchewan Regiment was reorganized into five separate regiments: The Regina Rifle Regiment, The Assiniboia Regiment (now the 10th Field Artillery Regiment, RCA), The Weyburn Regiment, The Saskatchewan Border Regiment, and The South Saskatchewan Regiment (later redesignated on 15 September 1924, as The King's Own Rifles of Canada and now The Saskatchewan Dragoons).

On 15 December 1936, as a result of the 1936 Canadian Militia reorganization, The Weyburn Regiment was amalgamated with The Saskatchewan Border Regiment to form The South Saskatchewan Regiment.

The South Saskatchewan Regiment would later go on to serve as part of the 2nd Canadian Infantry Division during the Second World War, most notably during the Dieppe Raid of August 1942 and later during the Normandy Campaign of 1944.

== Perpetuations ==
- 152nd Battalion, CEF

== Organization ==
The Weyburn Regiment had its regimental headquarters at Weyburn, and companies at Weyburn, Arcola, Carlyle and Osage.

== Alliances ==
Until 1936, The Weyburn Regiment was allied to The Royal Warwickshire Regiment.

== Battle honours ==
=== Great War ===
- Arras 1917
- Hill 70
