= Arctic Response Company Group =

The Arctic Response Company Group (ARCG) is a group of company-sized units of the Canadian Forces and the Canadian Army.

In 2007, the Canadian Army was tasked to stand-up and train four Arctic Response Company Groups, in cooperation with the Canada First Defence Strategy.

== Roles and responsibilities ==
The Arctic Response Company Group was created to support the Regular Force and the Canadian Rangers in operations to ensure security and the protection of Canada's national security and sovereignty in the Canadian Arctic.

== History ==
The ARCG from 38 Canadian Brigade Group participated in Exercise ARCTIC RAM, conducted by Land Force Western Area and 1 Canadian Mechanized Brigade Group in February 2012. Exercise Arctic Ram 12 took place near Yellowknife, Northwest Territories.
