= Jack Nissenthall =

British radar expert (1919–1997)

Jack Nissen
- Born: Jack Maurice Nissenthall; 9 October 1919; Bow, London, England, United Kingdom
- Died: 1 January 1997 (aged 77); Canada
- Military career
- Allegiance: United Kingdom
- Branch: Royal Air Force
- Service years: 1939-1945
- Rank: Flight Sergeant
- Nickname: The GCI King
- Conflicts: Dieppe Raid
- Awards: None

Jack Nissenthall (later shortened to Jack Nissen) was a British Royal Air Force electronics and radar expert who played a key role in the Dieppe raid. His actions during the operation resulted in the Allies' gaining vital intelligence about the type, density and location of German radar installations along the Channel coast. The intelligence gathered by his actions also spurred the development of Allied radar jamming countermeasures, the technology of which Nissenthall also assisted in developing after the raid. His role in radar development and his actions during the Dieppe raid were never officially acknowledged, and he received no awards.

== Early life ==
Jack Maurice Nissenthall was born in Bow, London, on 9 October 1919, the son of Jewish immigrants. He was educated at Malmesbury Road primary school and Mansford technical school. From an early age Nissenthall had shown a great interest and aptitude in electronics and wireless, and took a position with EMI in 1935 at the age of sixteen, firstly at the EMI factory in Hayes, Hillingdon and then at their main retail outlet in Tottenham Court Road. At the same time he was enrolled at the Regent Street Polytechnic studying advanced electronics.

== R.A.F Apprentice and early wartime service ==
In 1936, Nissenthall was talent scouted by the R.A.F and given an apprenticeship which involved him working during his free time at the experimental radar station at Bawdsey Manor in Suffolk, thus involving him at a critical period in the pioneering work of Robert Watson-Watt and his team. On the outbreak of war in September 1939, Nissenthall volunteered for service in the R.A.F. His request for flight duties was refused and instead he was posted to R.A.F Yatesbury where he was assigned to the first R.D.F (Radio Direction Finding) training school in Britain. Thereafter he was posted to various radar installations across the country. His skills and his abilities were increasingly being recognised by higher authority, as indicated by his suggestions for technical improvement of equipment being regularly accepted without question. By early 1942, with the rank of sergeant, he was stationed at Hope Cove in Devon, where he had been instrumental in establishing a pioneering Ground-control intercept (G.C.I.) facility. This and his other contributions had by this time led to him being nicknamed "The G.C.I king".

== Volunteering for a special assignment ==
Since being rejected for aircrew service due to the value of his technical knowledge, he made it known he was prepared to be involved in special assignments where his knowledge would be of use, and would often give up his leave to pursue further training, including taking the commando course.

In early 1942 Nissenthall was ordered to report in person for an interview in London and was asked to volunteer for a dangerous assignment.

== Operation Jubilee ==
Operation Jubilee, or the Dieppe Raid, was an Allied attack on the German-occupied port of Dieppe during the Second World War. The raid took place on the northern coast of France on 19 August 1942. Nissenthall was selected to enter the Pourville Radar Station to gain vital intelligence on the new German Freya radar, and was escorted by a team of 11 men from the South Saskatchewan Regiment, to protect him but also to prevent his capture, due to his exceptional technical knowledge.

Nissenthall volunteered for the mission fully aware that, due to the highly sensitive nature of his knowledge of Allied radar technology, his escort was under orders to kill him if necessary to prevent him from being captured. He also carried a cyanide pill as a last resort.

Nissenthall and his bodyguards failed to enter the radar station due to strong defences, but Nissenthall was able to crawl up to the rear of the station under enemy fire and cut all telephone wires leading to it. This forced the crew inside to resort to radio transmissions to talk to their commanders, transmissions which were intercepted by listening posts on the south coast of England. The Allies were able to learn a great deal about the location and density of German radar stations along the channel coast thanks to this single act, which helped to convince Allied commanders of the importance of developing radar jamming technology. Of this small unit, only Nissenthall and one other returned safely to England.

Due to the clandestine nature of his mission, he was not presented any awards for his actions.

== Later years ==
After the war, Jack Nissenthall shortened his surname to Nissen. He married and moved to South Africa.

In 1978, he emigrated to Canada, where he died in 1997.

== Historical Marker ==
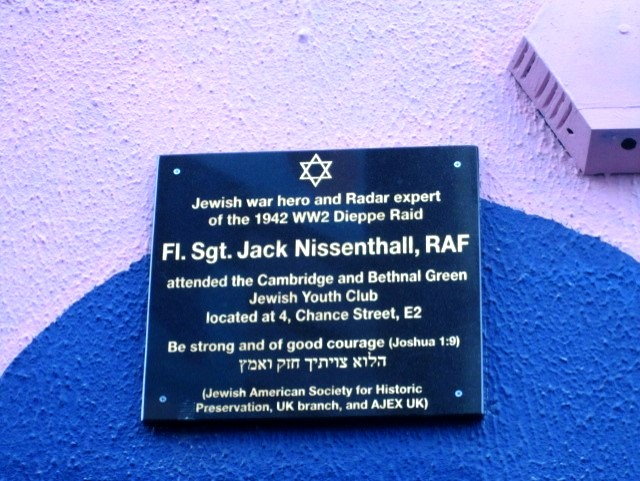
Fl. Sgt. Jack Nissenthal historical marker in London

A historical marker recognizing and honoring Fl. Sgt. Jack Nissenthal was placed in London by the Jewish American Society for Historic Preservation (U.K. Branch) and Association of Jewish Ex-Servicemen and Women (AJEX).

Text:

(Star of David)

Jewish War Hero and Radar Expert of 1942 WW2 Dieppe Raid

Fl. Sgt. Jack Nissenthal, RAF

Attended the Cambridge and Bethnal Green Jewish Youth Club located at 4 Chance Street.

Be strong and of good courage (Joshua 1:9)

(Hebrew)

Jewish American Society for Historic Preservation, U.K. Branch, and AJEX (U.K.)
