= Jonestown defense =

The Jonestown defense is an extreme corporation defense against hostile takeovers. In this strategy, the target firm engages in tactics that might threaten the firm's existence to thwart an imposing acquirer's bids. This is also known as a "suicide pill", and is an extreme version of the poison pill. The term refers to the 1978 Jonestown mass suicide in Guyana, where Jim Jones led the members of the Peoples Temple to kill themselves.

Jonestown Defense maneuvers are usually more extreme versions of existing tactics; share buybacks (which increase stock prices and decrease public equity at the cost of cash or debt financing), Crown Jewel maneuvers (selling off attractive assets at a discount to anyone except the acquirer) and similar. The main difference is that they are done to such an extreme that they threaten the company's livelihood. Companies attempting such maneuvers may thus find themselves insolvent, and in a position where they cannot resist continued takeover bids. The flip side is that the tactics reduce the company's value to potential buyers such that, unless the firm still possesses intangible assets (like a brand name or other intellectual property) that are valuable to the acquirer, the acquisition of this now-troubled firm becomes extremely unappealing.

== See also ==
- Mergers and acquisitions
- Industrial organization
