= 28th Battalion (Northwest), CEF =

28th Canadian Infantry Battalion, CEF
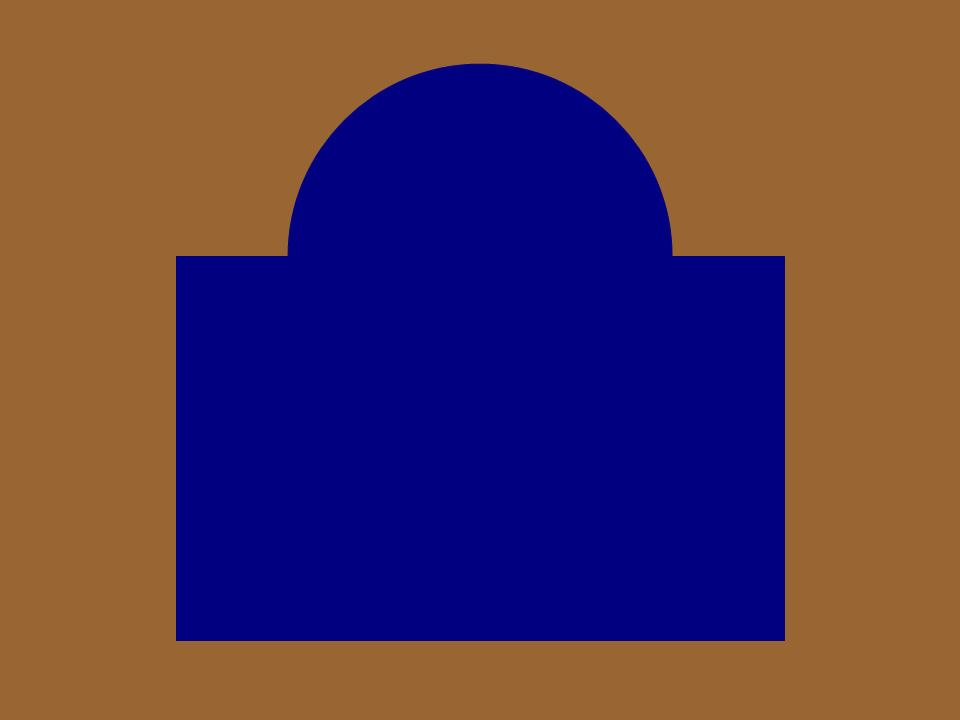
- Divisional (2nd Division) and brigade designation of the 28th Battalion
- Active: 1914–1920
- Disbanded: 1920
- Country: Canada
- Branch: Canadian Expeditionary Force
- Type: Infantry
- Part of: 6th Infantry Brigade, 2nd Canadian Division
- Mobilization headquarters: Winnipeg
- Battle honours: List: Mount Sorrel; Somme, 1916, '18; Flers–Courcelette; Thiepval; Ancre Heights; Arras, 1917, '18; Vimy, 1917; Scarpe, 1917, '18; Hill 70; Ypres, 1917; Passchendaele; Amiens; Drocourt–Quéant; Hindenburg Line; Canal du Nord; Cambrai, 1918; Pursuit to Mons; France and Flanders, 1915–18

The 28th Battalion (Northwest), CEF was an infantry battalion of the Canadian Expeditionary Force during the Great War.

== History ==
The battalion was authorized on 7 November 1914 and embarked for Britain on 29 May 1915. It disembarked in France on 18 September 1915, where it fought as part of the 6th Infantry Brigade, 2nd Canadian Division, in France and Flanders until the end of the war.

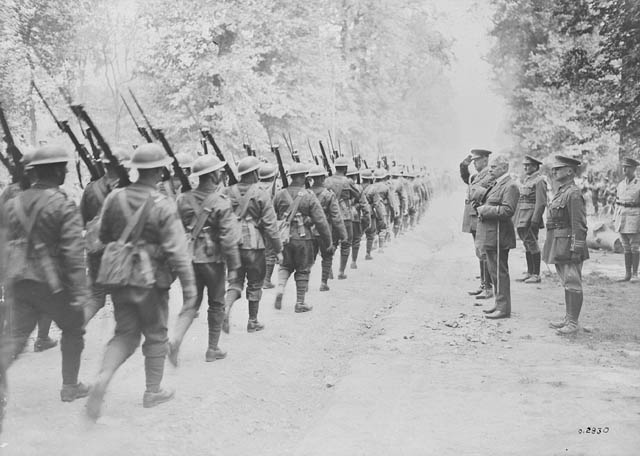
28th Battalion marching past Sir Robert Borden. July, 1918

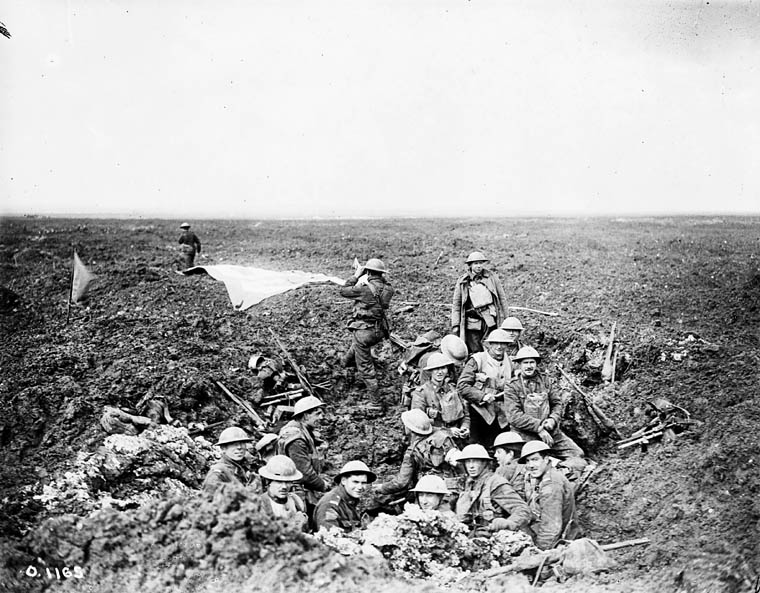
28th Battalion establishing a signal station at the Battle of Vimy Ridge

The 28th Battalion originally recruited in Saskatoon, Regina, Moose Jaw and Prince Albert, Saskatchewan and Fort William and Port Arthur (now Thunder Bay), Ontario and was mobilized at Winnipeg, Manitoba.

The battalion had five officers commanding:

- Lieutenant-Colonel J.F.L. Embury, CMG, 29 May 1915 – 17 September 1916
- Lieutenant-Colonel A. Ross, DSO, 17 September 1916 – 1 October 1918
- Major G.F.D. Bond, MC, 2 October 1918 – 6 November 1918
- Major A.F. Simpson, DSO, 6 November 1918 – 16 December 1918
- Lieutenant-Colonel D.E. MacIntyre, DSO, MC, 16 December 1918–demobilization

The battalion was disbanded on 30 August 1920. The battalion's regimental colours were laid up at the Saskatchewan Legislative Building in 1919, and were transferred to St. Paul's Cathedral in 1977 along with the colours of several other battalions. The colours went into storage in when the cathedral underwent renovations in 2024, and in October 2026 they were again laid up in the rotunda of the Legislative Building.

== Battle honours ==
The 28th Battalion was awarded the following battle honours:

- MOUNT SORREL
- SOMME, 1916, '18
- Flers-Courcelette
- Thiepval
- Ancre Heights
- ARRAS, 1917, '18
- Vimy, 1917
- Scarpe, 1917, '18
- HILL 70
- Ypres 1917
- Passchendaele
- AMIENS
- HINDENBURG LINE
- Drocourt-Quéant
- Canal du Nord
- Cambrai, 1918
- PURSUIT TO MONS
- FRANCE AND FLANDERS, 1915-18

== Perpetuation ==
The perpetuation of the 28th Battalion was assigned in 1920 to 1st Battalion (28th Battalion, CEF), The South Saskatchewan Regiment, and has been passed down as follows:

- 1st Battalion (28th Battalion, CEF), The South Saskatchewan Regiment: 1920–1924
- 1st Battalion (28th Battalion, CEF), The Regina Rifle Regiment: 1924–1936
- The Regina Rifle Regiment: 1936–1982
- The Royal Regina Rifle Regiment: 1982–1984
- The Royal Regina Rifles: 1984–present

== See also ==
- List of infantry battalions in the Canadian Expeditionary Force
- Saskatchewan War Memorial, which features a statue honouring the battalion

== Sources ==
Canadian Expeditionary Force 1914-1919 by Col. G.W.L. Nicholson, CD, Queen's Printer, Ottawa, Ontario, 1962
