= 68th Battalion (Regina), CEF =

Canadian infantry battalion

The 68th Battalion (Regina), CEF was an infantry battalion of the Canadian Expeditionary Force during the Great War. The 68th Battalion was authorized on 20 April 1915 and embarked for Britain on 28 April 1916. It provided reinforcements for the Canadian Corps in the field until 6 July 1916, when its personnel were absorbed by the 32nd Reserve Battalion, CEF. The battalion was disbanded on 21 May 1917.

The 68th Battalion recruited in Regina and district and Moose Jaw and district, in Saskatchewan and was mobilized at Regina.

The battalion was commanded by Lieutenant-Colonel T.E. Perrott, from 1 May 1916 to 6 July 1916.

The 68th Battalion was awarded the battle honour The Great War, 1916.

The 68th Battalion (Regina), CEF is perpetuated by The Royal Regina Rifles.

The battalion's regimental colours were laid up at the Saskatchewan Legislative Building in 1919, and were transferred to St. Paul's Cathedral in 1977 along with the colours of several other battalions. The colours went into storage in when the cathedral underwent renovations in 2024, and in October 2026 they were again laid up in the rotunda of the Legislative Building.

== Sources ==
- Canadian Expeditionary Force 1914-1919 by Col. G.W.L. Nicholson, CD, Queen's Printer, Ottawa, Ontario, 1962
