= R. D. McNaughton Building =

Coordinates: 50.14494345978311°N 101.664310347266°W

The McNaughton Building is a historic property in the town of Moosomin, Saskatchewan.

== Heritage designation ==
Designated in 2004, the McNaughton Building is a Municipal Heritage Property situated on two large lots in the town of Moosomin. The property features a two storey brick and fieldstone commercial building constructed between 1886 and 1890.

== Historical background and use ==
One of a handful of pre-1890 commercial buildings in Saskatchewan, it was constructed in 1886 with a major addition in 1890. The oldest part of the building was constructed of field stone in the Second Empire style, signified by the mansard roof with inset dormer windows bordered by intricate woodwork. The 1890 brick and fieldstone addition was designed in an elaborate rendition of boomtown commercial architecture. The original owners, the McNaughton family, were prominent in Moosomin from the time R.D. McNaughton established his original wholesale and retail store in 1882. They were the main wholesale supplier for towns across south-eastern Saskatchewan. Although R.D. McNaughton sold the business in 1909, successive owners continued to use the McNaughton name until the closure of the store in 1956.

== New use ==
The owner, McNaughton Enterprises Ltd. (2004), is planning to rehabilitate the building in order to make it commercially viable. The building now holds rental suites, many businesses and the Moosomin Family Resource Centre.

== Estimated costs and Government of Canada's contribution ==
Total project costs were $75,060. The Government of Canada's contribution reached a total of $15,012.

== Resources ==
- Parks Canada
