= 38 Canadian Brigade Group =

Brigade of the Canadian Army

- 38^{e} Groupe-brigade du Canada
- Active: 1 April 1997–present
- Country: Canada
- Branch: Canadian Army Primary Reserve
- Type: Headquarters
- Part of: 2nd Canadian Division
- Garrison/HQ: Winnipeg, Manitoba
- Motto: Progredere ne regredere (Latin for 'Ever forward never back')
- March: "March Past of 38 Brigade"
- Website: canada.ca/en/army/corporate/3-canadian-division/38-canadian-brigade-group.html

Commanders
- Brigade commander: Col Evelyn Kotzer
- Brigade sergeant-major: CWO Joel Pedersen

Insignia
NATO Map Symbol
38 CBG
2 Cdn Div
- Abbreviation: 38 CBG

38 Canadian Brigade Group (38 CBG) (French: 38^{e} Groupe-brigade du Canada) is a formation of the Canadian Forces and Canadian Army's 2nd Canadian Division. The brigade group is composed of Primary Reserve units in Manitoba, Saskatchewan and Northwestern Ontario east to Thunder Bay. Geographically, 38 CBG is Canada's largest brigade group. The brigade headquarters is in Winnipeg, Manitoba.

The brigade's units are spread out over many communities, and most of the soldiers serving in the brigade's units are reservists, part-time soldiers who serve within units in those communities. The brigade group is prepared to deploy and augment the Regular Force of the 2nd Canadian Division in domestic operations (natural disasters, etc.) as well as support battle groups.

The brigade has served in several domestic operations, including Operation Assistance (the assistance to the Manitoba's 1997 flood), and Operation Peregrine (assistance to the 2003 BC forest fire emergency). Many soldiers of the brigade deployed to Afghanistan, as well as on UN and NATO missions.

The commander of the 38 CBG is Colonel Evelyn Kotzer. The 38 CBG brigade sergeant-major (BSM) is Chief Warrant Officer Joel Pedersen.

== Brigade units ==
Unit	Role	Locations
38 Canadian Brigade Group Headquarters	Headquarters	Winnipeg
Saskatchewan Dragoons	Armoured cavalry	Moose Jaw
Fort Garry Horse	Armoured cavalry	Winnipeg
10th Field Artillery Regiment, RCA	Artillery	Regina, Yorkton
26th Field Artillery Regiment, RCA	Artillery	Brandon, Portage la Prairie
116th Independent Field Battery, RCA	Artillery	Kenora
38 Combat Engineer Regiment	Combat engineering	Winnipeg, Saskatoon
38 Signal Regiment	Communications	Regina, Saskatoon, Thunder Bay, Winnipeg
Royal Winnipeg Rifles	Light infantry	Winnipeg
Lake Superior Scottish Regiment	Light infantry	Thunder Bay
North Saskatchewan Regiment	Light infantry	Saskatoon, Prince Albert
Royal Regina Rifles	Light infantry	Regina
Queen's Own Cameron Highlanders of Canada	Light infantry	Winnipeg
38 Service Battalion	Service and support	Regina, Saskatoon, Thunder Bay, Winnipeg

Also under command of the brigade group headquarters is the 38 Canadian Brigade Group Arctic Response Company Group (ARCG).

Cities with 38 CBG units
