= 217th (Qu'Appelle) Battalion, CEF =

The 217th Battalion, CEF was a unit in the Canadian Expeditionary Force during the First World War. Based in Moosomin, Saskatchewan, the unit began recruiting in early 1916 throughout the district. After sailing to England in June 1917, the battalion was absorbed into the 19th Reserve Battalion on June 9, 1917. The 217th Battalion, CEF had one Officer Commanding: Lieut-Col. A. B. Gillis.

The 217th Battalion, CEF is currently perpetuated by the 10th Field Artillery Regiment, RCA.
