= Royal Regina Rifles =

The Royal Regina Rifles
- Badge of The Royal Regina Rifles
- Active: 1905–present
- Country: Canada
- Branch: Canadian Army
- Type: Infantry (rifles)
- Role: Direct fire support
- Part of: 38 Canadian Brigade Group
- Garrison/HQ: Regina, Saskatchewan
- Mottos: Celer et audax (Latin for 'Swift and bold')
- Colours: Rifle green with scarlet facings (full dress and mess dress)
- March: Quick March: "Lützow's Wild Hunt"; Double Past: "Keel Row"
- Engagements: First World War; Second World War; War in Afghanistan
- Battle honours: See #Battle honours
- Website: www.canada.ca/en/army/corporate/3-canadian-division/the-royal-regina-rifles.html

Commanders
- Current commander: LCol Kevin Barry
- Colonel-in-chief: Anne, Princess Royal
- Abbreviation: RRR

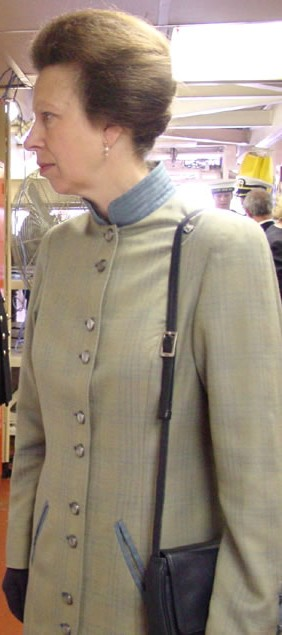
Anne, Princess Royal, is colonel-in-chief of RRR and visited her regiment in 1982, 2004 and 2007

The Royal Regina Rifles is a Primary Reserve infantry regiment of the Canadian Army. Prior to 1982 the regiment was known as The Regina Rifle Regiment. The regiment is part of 38 Canadian Brigade Group.

The regiment was nicknamed "The Johns" during World War II because of the high proportion of "Farmer Johns" in its ranks.

== Lineage ==
=== The Royal Regina Rifles ===
- Originated 3 July 1905 in Regina, Saskatchewan when a "regiment of infantry in the districts of Assiniboia and Saskatchewan" was authorized
- Redesignated 2 April 1907 as the 95th Regiment
- Redesignated 1 May 1908 as a rifle regiment
- Redesignated 1 June 1909 as two separate regiments, designated the 105th Regiment (now The North Saskatchewan Regiment) and the 95th Regiment
- Redesignated 16 September 1913 as the 95th "Saskatchewan Rifles"
- Amalgamated 15 March 1920 with the 60th Rifles of Canada and redesignated as The South Saskatchewan Regiment
- Reorganized 15 May 1924 into five separate regiments: The Weyburn Regiment (now The South Saskatchewan Regiment); The Saskatchewan Border Regiment (now The South Saskatchewan Regiment); The South Saskatchewan Regiment (now The Saskatchewan Dragoons); The Assiniboia Regiment (now the 10th Field Artillery Regiment, RCA); and The Regina Rifle Regiment
- Amalgamated 15 December 1936 with the 'Headquarters' and 'A Company' of the 12th Machine Gun Battalion, CMGC and retaining the designation as The Regina Rifle Regiment
- Redesignated 7 November 1940 as the 2nd Battalion, The Regina Rifle Regiment
- Redesignated 4 April 1946 as The Regina Rifle Regiment
- Redesignated 5 July 1982 as The Royal Regina Rifle Regiment
- Redesignated 24 October 1984 as The Royal Regina Rifles

=== The 60th Rifles of Canada ===
- Originated 2 January 1913 in Moose Jaw, Saskatchewan as the 60th Rifles of Canada
- Amalgamated 15 March 1920 with the 95th Saskatchewan Rifles

=== The 12th Machine Gun Battalion, CMGC ===
- Originated 1 June 1919 in Saskatoon, Saskatchewan as the 12th Machine Gun Brigade, CMGC
- Redesignated 15 September 1924 as the 12th Machine Gun Battalion, CMGC
- Amalgamated 15 December 1936 with The Regina Rifle Regiment

== Operational history ==
=== The Great War ===
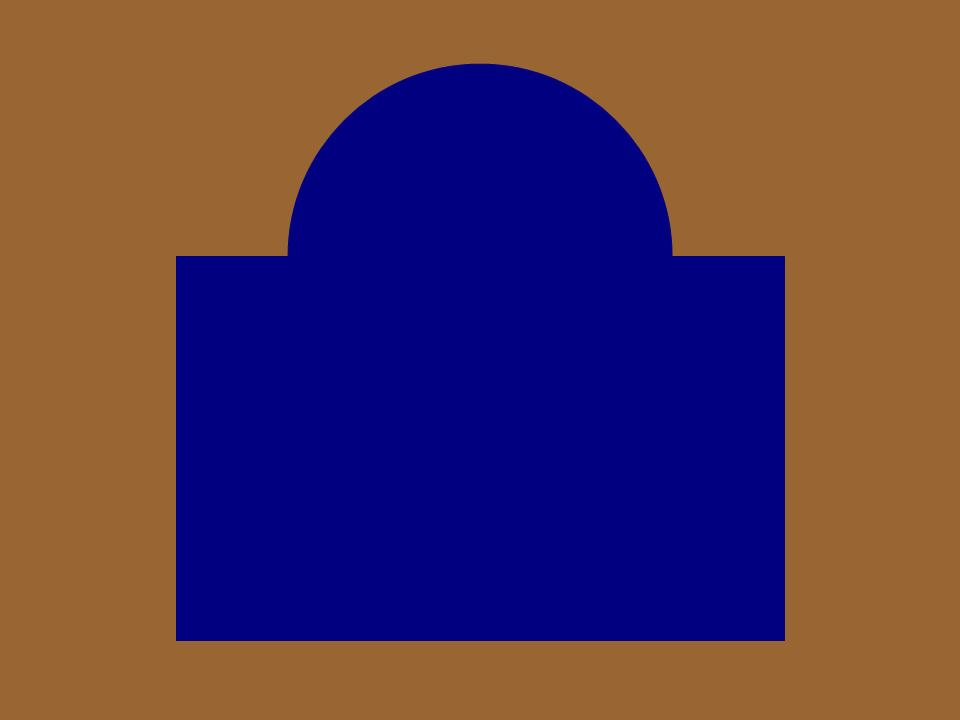
The distinguishing patch of the 28th Battalion (Northwest), CEF.

Details of the 95th Saskatchewan Rifles were placed on active service on 6 August 1914 for local protective duty.

The 28th Battalion (Northwest), CEF, was authorized on 7 November 1914 and embarked for Britain on 29 May 1915 and arrived in France on 18 September 1915. The 28th Battalion fought as part of the 6th Infantry Brigade, 2nd Canadian Division in France and Flanders until the end of the war. The 28th Battalion disbanded on 30 August 1920.

The 68th Battalion (Regina), CEF, was authorized on 20 April 1915 and embarked for Britain on 28 April 1916, where it provided reinforcements for units in the field until 6 July 1916, when its personnel were absorbed by the 32nd Reserve Battalion, CEF.

The 195th Battalion (City of Regina), CEF, was authorized on 15 July 1916. Based in Regina, Saskatchewan, the unit began recruiting during the winter of 1915/16 in that city. It embarked for Britain on 31 October 1916, where its personnel were absorbed by the 32nd Reserve Battalion, on 11 or 12 November 1916, to provide reinforcements for units the field. Lieutenant-Colonel A. C. Garner commanded the battalion throughout its existence.

=== Between the Wars ===
On 15 May 1924, following extensive reorganizations of the Canadian Militia, each of the South Saskatchewan Regiment's battalions became a distinct regiment, and the Regina Rifle Regiment was created from the 1st Battalion. In the 1936 reorganization of the Militia, the Headquarters and A Company of the 12th Machine Gun Battalion, CMGC, merged into the Regina Rifles, which existed as a single battalion militia regiment until 1939.

=== The Second World War ===
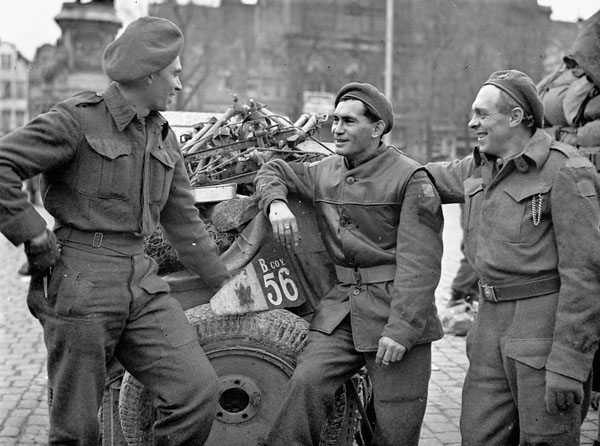
Three soldiers of the Regina Rifles Regiment who landed in France on June 6, 1944, in Ghent, Belgium, November 8, 1944

Details from the regiment were called out on service on 26 August 1939 and then placed on active service on 1 September 1939 as The Regina Rifle Regiment, CASF (Canadian Active Service Force), for local protection duties. The details called out on active service were disbanded on 31 December 1940. The regiment subsequently mobilized The Regina Rifle Regiment, CASF, for active service on 24 May 1940. It was redesignated the 1st Battalion, The Regina Rifle Regiment, CASF, on 7 November 1940 and embarked for Britain on 24 August 1941. On D-Day, 6 June 1944, it landed in Normandy, France as part of the 7th Infantry Brigade, 3rd Canadian Infantry Division, and it continued to fight in North-West Europe until the end of the war. The 1st Battalion was disbanded on 15 January 1946.

Farmer Johns was their nickname and the name's origin came from other Canadian soldiers dismissing them as "just a bunch of Farmer Johns". They were farmers, students, and fur trappers who served as soldiers of Regina Rifles Regiment of the Canadian military.

The regiment mobilized the 3rd Battalion, The Regina Rifle Regiment, CASF, for active service on 12 May 1942. It was subsequently redesignated the 2nd Airfield Defence Battalion (The Regina Rifle Regiment), CASF, on 19 July 1943 and served in Canada in a home defence role as part of Pacific Command. It was disbanded on 15 November 1943.

On 1 June 1945, a third Active Force component of the regiment, the 4th Battalion, The Regina Rifle Regiment, CIC, CAOF, was mobilized for service with the Canadian Army Occupation Force in Germany. The 4th Battalion was disbanded on 4 April 1946. The 2nd (Reserve) Battalion did not mobilize.

During the Second World War members of the regiment received 14 Military Medals with one bar to that award, seven Distinguished Service Orders, seven Military Cross awards, a British Empire Medal, an Africa Star, three French Croix de Guerre, and a Netherlands Bronze Lion. Many more were Mentioned in Dispatches.

The regiment suffered 458 fatal casualties by 7 May 1945.

Its first taste of combat came in Normandy, landing on Juno Beach on D-Day, during which it was the first Canadian regiment to successfully secure a beachhead. It later faced the 12th SS Panzer Division Hitlerjugend, which was almost completely annihilated by the British and Canadian forces. The regiment later entered Caen.

=== Korea and NATO ===
In 1946, the regiment reverted to a single-battalion militia regiment.

On 4 May 1951, the regiment mobilized two temporary Active Force companies designated "E" and "F" Company. "E" Company was reduced to nil strength upon its personnel being incorporated into the 1st Canadian Rifle Battalion for service in Germany as part of the 27th Canadian Infantry Brigade on North Atlantic Treaty Organization duty in Germany. "F" Company was initially used as a reinforcement pool for "E" Company. On 15 May 1952, it was reduced to nil strength, upon its personnel being absorbed by the newly formed 2nd Canadian Rifle Battalion for service in Korea with the United Nations. "F" Company was disbanded on 29 July 1953. The 1st and 2nd Canadian Rifle Battalions which became the Regular Force 1st and 2nd Battalions of the Queen's Own Rifles of Canada.

Royal was added to the regimental title on 5 July 1982, and the name was shortened to the Royal Regina Rifles on 24 October 1984.

=== United Nations missions (1980–2000) ===
Since the reductions of the Regular Force battalions, the Primary Reserve members of the regiment have augmented the Regular Force units and deployed operationally in support of operations in Cyprus, Former Yugoslavia, and Bosnia.

Regimental camp flag.

=== Afghanistan ===
The regiment contributed an aggregate of more than 20% of its authorized strength to the various Task Forces which served in Afghanistan between 2002 and 2014.

=== 2015 onwards ===
Soldiers of the Royal Regina Rifles contribute to domestic and expeditionary operations on a regular basis.

Operation Lentus
Wildfires in Saskatchewan's north threatening life and property of Canadians.
Operation Reassurance
NATO's commitment to stability in Eastern Europe.

=== Freedom of the city ===
On 5 September 2015, the largest freedom of the city parade in Regina since the end of the Second World War was exercised by the Royal Regina Rifles. Collaborating with all local military units (HMCS Queen; 10th Field Artillery Regiment, RCA; 38 Signal Regiment; 38 Service Battalion; 16 Field Ambulance; and 15 Wing Moose Jaw) a Canadian Armed Forces Open House was held at the Regina Armoury throughout the day. The culmination of the day was a charity gala dinner entertaining over 315 guests. The patron for the evening was the Lieutenant Governor of Saskatchewan. The charity raised seed money for a rewrite of the regimental history.

Previous to that a freedom of the city was exercised by the Royal Regina Rifles in Regina on June 4, 2007.

== Perpetuations ==
=== The Great War ===
- 28th Battalion (Northwest), CEF
- 68th Battalion (Regina), CEF
- 195th (City of Regina) Battalion, CEF.

== Battle honours ==
In the list below, battle honours in capitals were awarded for participation in large operations and campaigns, while those in lowercase indicate honours granted for more specific battles. Rifle regiments do not carry colours. They may emblazon their battle honours on regimental appointments such as cap badges. Those battle honours in bold type are authorized to be emblazoned on regimental appointments.

=== Great War ===
- **Mount Sorrel**
- Somme, 1916, '18
- **Flers–Courcelette**
- Thiepval
- Ancre Heights
- **Arras, 1917, '18**
- **Vimy, 1917**
- Scarpe, 1917, '18
- Hill 70
- **Ypres, 1917**
- **Passchendaele**
- **Amiens**
- Drocourt–Quéant
- Hindenburg Line
- Canal du Nord
- **Cambrai, 1918**
- **Pursuit to Mons**
- **France and Flanders, 1915–'18**

=== Second World War ===
- **Normandy Landing**
- **Bretteville–l'Orgeuilleuse**
- **Caen**
- **The Orne**
- Bourguébus Ridge
- Faubourg de Vaucelles
- **Falaise**
- The Laison
- The Seine, 1944
- **Calais, 1944**
- **The Scheldt**
- **Leopold Canal**
- Breskens Pocket
- The Rhineland
- Waal Flats
- **Moyland Wood**
- The Rhine
- **Emmerich–Hoch Elten**
- Deventer
- North-West Europe, 1944–45

=== Afghanistan ===
- Afghanistan

== Alliances ==
- United Kingdom - The Rifles

== Media ==
- Up the Johns! The Story of the Royal Regina Rifles by Stewart A.G Mein (1992)
- In the flashback scenes in the film I Confess, where Montgomery Clift is a soldier in World War II, he is wearing a uniform with a "Regina Rifle Regiment Canada" shoulder patch.

== Regimental Museum of The Royal Regina Rifles ==
The Regimental Museum of The Royal Regina Rifles is in the Regina Armoury in the Saskatchewan Military Museum.

== Regimental church ==
The regimental church is St. Paul's Cathedral in Regina. The colours of units that the Royal Regina Rifles perpetuate hang in perpetuity in the cathedral.

== Lineage chart ==
Lineage chart

1905	Regt of infy authorized
1907	95th Regt
1909	95th Sask. Rifles
1912	95th Regt	105th Regt
1913	95th "Sask. Rifles"
1914	28th Bn, CEF
1915	68th "Overseas" Bn, CEF
1916	Absorbed by 32nd Reserve Bn	195th "Overseas" Bn, CEF
1916	Absorbed by 32nd Reserve Bn
1919	12th MG Bde, CMGC
1920	Disbanded
1920	1st Bn (28th Bn, CEF), The South Sask. Regt
1924	1st Bn (28th Bn, CEF), The Regina Rifle Regt	2nd Bn (68th Bn, CEF), (Note: Reserve) The Regina Rifle Regt	12th MG Bn, CMGC
1930	3rd (Reserve) Bn (195th Bn, CEF), The Regina Rifle Regt
1936	Disbanded	Disbanded
1936	The Regina Rifle Regt
1940	The Regina Rifle Regt, CASF
1940	1st Bn, The Regina Rifle Regt, CASF	2nd Bn, The Regina Rifle Regt
1942	3rd Bn, The Regina Rifle Regt, CASF
1943	2nd Airfield Defence Bn (The Regina Rifle Regt), CASF
1943	Disbanded
1945	4th Bn, The Regina Rifle Regt, CIC, CAOF
1946	Disbanded	The Regina Rifle Regt	Disbanded
1951	"E" Coy, (Note: Regular Force) The Regina Rifle Regt	"F" Coy, The Regina Rifle Regt
1951	Absorbed by 1st Canadian Rifle Bn
1952	Absorbed by 2nd Canadian Rifle Bn
1953
1982	The Royal Regina Rifle Regt
1984	The Royal Regina Rifles

== See also ==
- List of Canadian organizations with royal patronage
- The Canadian Crown and the Canadian Forces

== Order of precedence ==
Preceded by North Saskatchewan Regiment	The Royal Regina Rifles	Succeeded by The Rocky Mountain Rangers
