= 128th (Moose Jaw) Battalion, CEF =

128th "Overseas" Battalion, CEF
- Active: 1915–1920
- Disbanded: 1920
- Country: Canada
- Branch: Canadian Expeditionary Force
- Type: Infantry
- Mobilization headquarters: Moose Jaw
- Battle honours: The Great War, 1916–17

Commanders
- Officer commanding: Lieut-Col. Francis Pawlett

The 128th Battalion, CEF was a unit in the Canadian Expeditionary Force during the First World War. Based in Moose Jaw, Saskatchewan, the unit began recruiting in late 1915 in that city and the surrounding district. After sailing to England in August 1916, the battalion was absorbed into the 15th and 19th Reserve Battalions on August 24, 1916. The 128th Battalion, CEF had one officer commanding: Lieutenant-Colonel Francis Pawlett.

In 1929, the battalion was awarded the theatre of war honour "The Great War, 1916–17".

The 128th Battalion is perpetuated by The Saskatchewan Dragoons.

== Bibliography ==
- Meek, John F. (1971). Over the Top! The Canadian Infantry in the First World War. Orangeville, Ont.: The Author.
