= 152nd (Weyburn-Estevan) Battalion, CEF =

152nd Battalion, CEF
- Active: 1915–1917
- Disbanded: 1917
- Country: Canada
- Branch: Canadian Expeditionary Force
- Type: Infantry
- Mobilization headquarters: Weyburn, Saskatachewan
- Battle honours: The Great War, 1916

Commanders
- Commanding officer: LCol S. B. Nelles

The 152nd Battalion, CEF, was a unit of the Canadian Expeditionary Force during the Great War. It was authorized on 22 December 1915, recruiting in Weyburn and Estevan, Saskatchewan, and embarked for Great Britain on 3 October 1916, where its personnel were absorbed by the 32nd Reserve Battalion, CEF, on 21 October 1916 to provide reinforcements for the Canadian Corps in the field. The battalion was disbanded on 21 May 1917.

The 152nd Battalion had one officer commanding: Lieutenant-Colonel S. B. Nelles.

The 152nd Battalion is perpetuated by The South Saskatchewan Regiment, the perpetuation having been passed down through these units:

- 1st Battalion (152nd Battalion, CEF), The Saskatchewan Border Regiment (1924–1936)
- The South Saskatchewan Regiment (1936–present)

The battalion's king's colour and regimental colour are laid up at the Estevan branch of the Royal Canadian Legion.

In 1929, the battalion was awarded the theatre of war honour The Great War, 1916.
