= 46th Battalion (South Saskatchewan), CEF =

46th Canadian Infantry Battalion, CEF
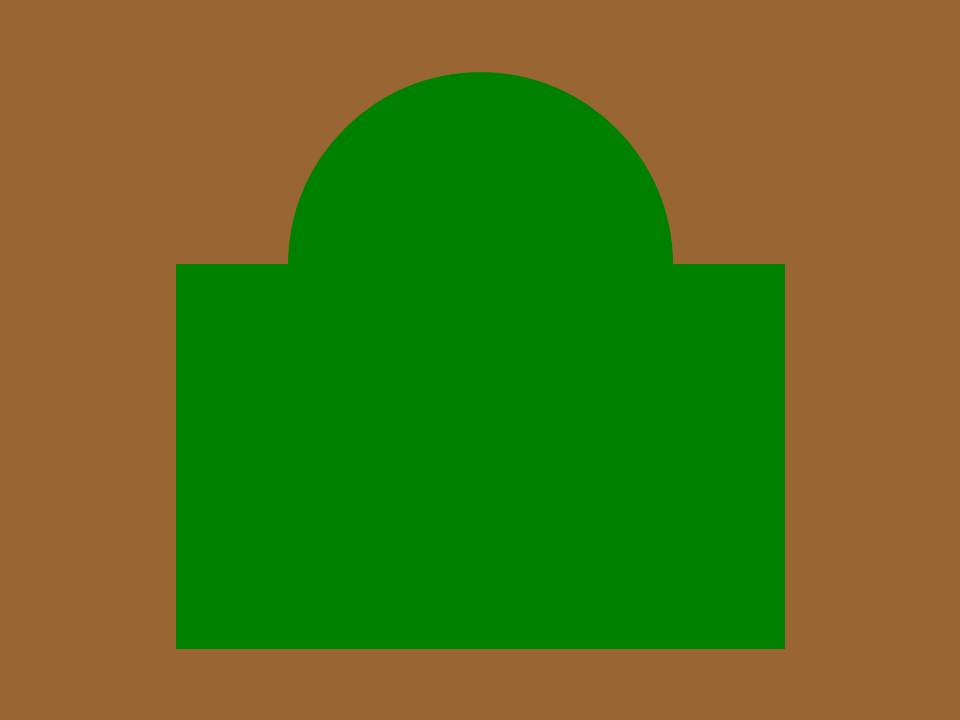
- Distinguishing patch of the battalion
- Active: 1914–1920
- Disbanded: 1920
- Country: Canada
- Branch: Canadian Expeditionary Force
- Type: Infantry
- Part of: 10th Infantry Brigade, 4th Canadian Division
- Mobilization headquarters: Moose Jaw
- Battle honours: List: Somme, 1916; Ancre Heights; Ancre, 1916; Arras, 1917, '18; Vimy, 1917; Hill 70; Ypres, 1917; Passchendaele; Amiens; Scarpe, 1918; Dorcourt–Quéant; Hindenburg Line; Canal du Nord; Valenciennes; France and Flanders, 1916–18

The 46th Battalion (South Saskatchewan), CEF, was an infantry battalion of the Canadian Expeditionary Force during the Great War.

== History ==
The 46th Battalion was authorized on 7 November 1914 and embarked for Britain on 23 October 1915. On 11 August 1916 it disembarked in France, where it fought with the 10th Infantry Brigade, 4th Canadian Division in France and Flanders until the end of the war. The battalion was disbanded on 30 August 1920.

The unit has come to be known as "The Suicide Battalion". The 46th Battalion lost 1,433 killed and 3,484 wounded – a casualty rate of 91.5 percent in 27 months.

The battalion recruited throughout Saskatchewan and was mobilized at Moose Jaw, Saskatchewan.

The 46th Battalion had two officers commanding:

- Lieutenant-Colonel H. Snell, 22 October 1915 – 29 August 1916
- Lieutenant-Colonel H.J. Dawson, CMG, DSO, 29 August 1916-Demobilization

One member of the 46th Battalion was awarded the Victoria Cross. Sergeant Hugh Cairns was posthumously awarded the Victoria Cross for his actions at Valenciennes on 1 November 1918.

== Battle honours ==
The 46th Battalion was awarded the following battle honours:

- SOMME, 1916
- Ancre Heights
- Ancre, 1916
- ARRAS, 1917, '18
- Vimy, 1917
- HILL 70
- Ypres, 1917
- Passchendaele
- AMIENS
- Scarpe, 1918
- Drocourt-Quéant
- HINDENBURG LINE
- Canal du Nord
- VALENCIENNES
- FRANCE AND FLANDERS, 1916-18

== Perpetuation ==
The perpetuation of the 46th Battalion was assigned in 1920 to 2nd Battalion (46th Battalion, CEF), The South Saskatchewan Regiment, and it is now perpetuated by The Saskatchewan Dragoons.

- 2nd Battalion (46th Battalion, CEF), The South Saskatchewan Regiment: 1920–1924
- 1st Battalion (46th Battalion, CEF), The King's Own Rifles of Canada: 1924–1936
- The King's Own Rifles of Canada (MG): 1936–1942
- The King's Own Rifles of Canada: 1942–1946
- 20th (Saskatchewan) Armoured Regiment, RCAC: 1946–1949
- 20th Saskatchewan Armoured Regiment: 1949–1954
- The Saskatchewan Dragoons (20th Armoured Regiment): 1954–1958
- The Saskatchewan Dragoons: 1958–present

== See also ==
- List of infantry battalions in the Canadian Expeditionary Force

== Sources ==
- Canadian Expeditionary Force 1914-1919 by Col. G.W.L. Nicholson, CD, Queen's Printer, Ottawa, Ontario, 1962
