= Hugh Cairns (VC) =

Canadian recipient of the Victoria Cross (1896–1918)

Hugh Cairns VC DCM
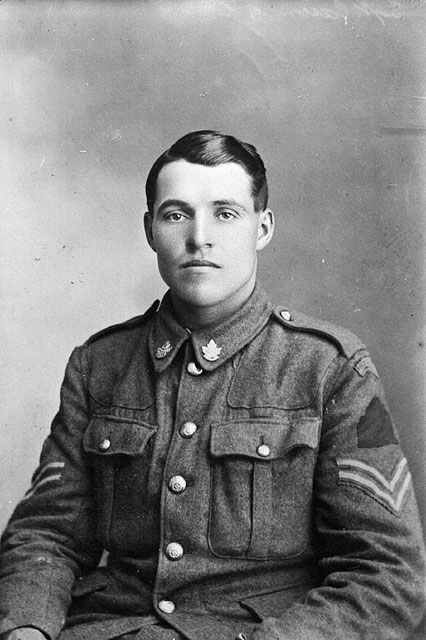
- Born: 4 December 1896; Ashington, England
- Died: 2 November 1918 (aged 21); Valenciennes, France
- Burial place: Auberchicourt British Cemetery
- Military career
- Allegiance: Canada
- Branch: Canadian Expeditionary Force
- Service years: 1915-1918
- Rank: Sergeant
- Units: 46th Battalion, CEF
- Conflicts: First World War: Western Front; Nivelle Offensive; Battle of Arras; Battle of Vimy Ridge; Hundred Days Offensive (DOW)
- Awards: Victoria Cross; Distinguished Conduct Medal; Légion d'honneur

Hugh Cairns VC DCM, (4 December 1896 – 2 November 1918) was a Canadian recipient of the Victoria Cross, the highest and most prestigious award for gallantry in the face of the enemy that can be awarded to British and Commonwealth forces.

== Background ==
He was born in Ashington, Northumberland, England. The Cairns family immigrated to Canada and settled in Saskatoon, Saskatchewan in 1911 when he was 15 years old. He was a member of the Christ Church Choir, and as a keen footballer, he played for the Christ Church Intermediate Boys Football club, reaching the championship of the Sunday School League, scoring one goal in 104 matches. He also played for the St. Thomas Church team when they won the Saskatoon League Championship in 1915.

Hugh and his elder brother Albert enlisted in the army in August 1915. Cairns was awarded the Distinguished Conduct Medal (DCM) for his actions at the Battle of Vimy Ridge in April 1917. At the time the DCM was the second highest award for gallantry in the British honours system.

== VC details ==
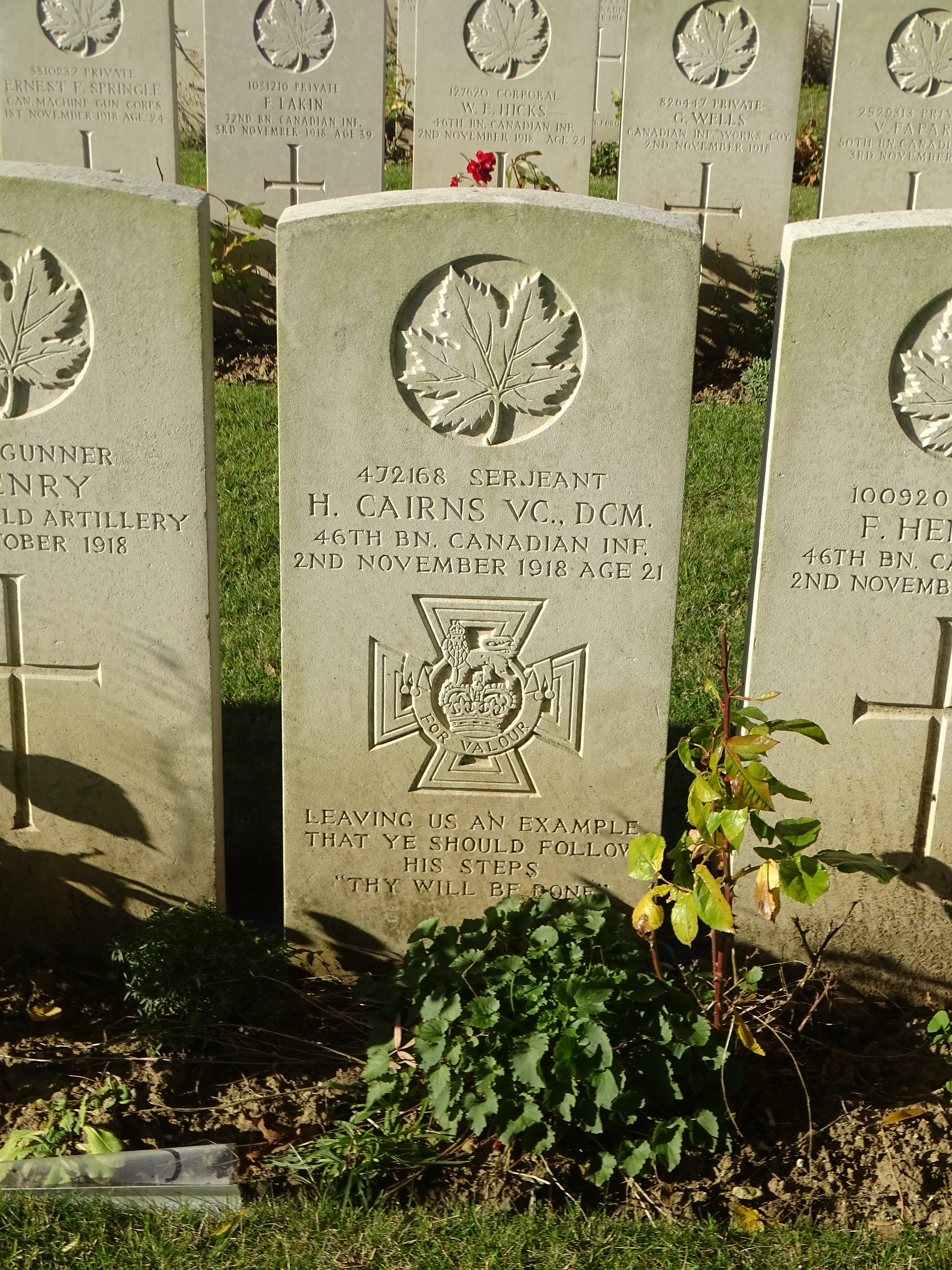
Cairns grave in 2021

He was 21 years old, and a sergeant in the 46th (South Saskatchewan) Battalion, Canadian Expeditionary Force during the Hundred Days Offensive of the First World War when the following deed took place for which he was awarded the VC.

For most conspicuous bravery before Valenciennes on 1st November, 1918, when a machine gun opened on his platoon. Without a moment's hesitation Serjt. Hugh Cairns seized a Lewis gun and single-handed, in the face of direct fire, rushed the post, killed the crew of five, and captured the gun. Later, when the line was held up by machine-gun fire, he again rushed forward, killing 12 enemies and capturing 18 and two guns.

Subsequently, when the advance was held up by machine guns and field guns, although wounded, he led a small party to outflank them, killing many, forcing about 50 to surrender, and capturing all the guns. After consolidation, he went with a battle patrol to exploit Marly and forced 60 enemies to surrender. Whilst disarming this party he was severely wounded. Nevertheless, he opened fire and inflicted heavy losses. Finally, he was rushed by about 20 enemies and collapsed from weakness and loss of blood.

Throughout the operation, he showed the highest degree of valour, and his leadership greatly contributed to the success of the attack. He died on 2 November from wounds.

With the German surrender and armistice on 11 November, ten days later, Sergeant Cairns would prove to be the last of seventy-one Canadians to earn the Victoria Cross for his actions in the Great War. Cairns was also awarded the Légion d'honneur by the Government of France.

Cairns is buried in the Auberchicourt British Cemetery, seven kilometres east of Douai, France, roughly sixteen kilometres north of Cambrai, (Plot I, Row A, Grave 8).

== Legacy ==
His Victoria Cross is displayed at the Canadian War Museum in Ottawa, Canada.

In March 1936, the town of Valenciennes renamed a street in the vicinity of his actions on 1 November 1918 "Avenue du Sergent Cairns" and a plaque commemorating his valorous actions was installed on the side of a building opposite the Place du Canada on the street that bears his name.

Cairns has several buildings and locations named after him in his hometown of Saskatoon, Saskatchewan, including Hugh Cairns V.C. School (an elementary school that opened in 1960), the Hugh Cairns V.C. Armoury, and the Footballer's Memorial, a statue of Cairns in Kinsmen Park, where he used to play soccer before going off to war. The school is located on Cairns Avenue, however the street was not named for Hugh Cairns, but rather for Saskatoon pioneer John Cairns.
