= South Saskatchewan Regiment =

The South Saskatchewan Regiment
- Cap badge
- Active: July 3, 1905–September 1, 1968 (Militia); September 1, 1968–present (Supplementary Reserve)
- Country: Canada
- Branch: Canadian Militia (1905–1940); Canadian Army (1940–1968)
- Type: Line infantry
- Role: Infantry
- Size: One battalion
- Part of: Non-Permanent Active Militia (1905–1940); Royal Canadian Infantry Corps (1942–1968)
- Garrison/HQ: Estevan, Saskatchewan
- March: "Warwickshire Lads"
- Engagements: First World War; Second World War
- Battle honours: See #Battle honours

The South Saskatchewan Regiment was an infantry regiment of the Canadian Forces formed in 1936 by the amalgamation of The Weyburn Regiment and The Saskatchewan Border Regiment. It was reduced to nil strength and placed on the Supplementary Order of Battle (i.e., virtually disbanded) in 1968. They participated in the 1942 Dieppe Raid.

== History ==
The regiment traces its lineage to July 3, 1905, when an infantry regiment was authorized in the District of Assiniboia and the District of Saskatchewan, which later that year became the province of Saskatchewan. The regiment was eventually organized as the 95th Saskatchewan Rifles, in Regina. After the First World War the 95th merged with the 60th Rifles of Canada (in Moose Jaw) to become the South Saskatchewan Regiment, which expanded to five battalions with the creation of units in Weyburn (3rd Battalion), Moosomin (4th Battalion) and Estevan (5th Battalion).

In 1924, each of the battalions became a distinct regiment, and the name "South Saskatchewan Regiment" went out of use. In the 1936 reorganization of the Militia, The Weyburn Regiment and The Saskatchewan Border Regiment (in Estevan) re-amalgamated into a new South Saskatchewan Regiment.

During the Second World War, The South Saskatchewan Regiment participated in many major Canadian battles and operations, as part of the 2nd Canadian Infantry Division. The regiment fought in the Dieppe Raid of 1942, Operation Atlantic, Operation Spring, Operation Totalize, Operation Tractable, and the recapture of Dieppe in 1944. They, along with the 8th Reconnaissance Regiment (14th Canadian Hussars) liberated the Westerbork transit camp on 12 April 1945.

During the Dieppe Raid they also undertook one of the more unusual missions of the war. They provided a bodyguard for an RAF radar expert, Flight Sergeant Jack Nissenthall, who had volunteered to try penetrate a German radar station on a cliff above "Green Beach". Because Nissenthall knew the secrets of British and US radar technology, he was awarded a personal bodyguard of South Saskatchewan sharpshooters. Their orders were to protect him, but in the event of possible capture to kill him. He survived and his action enabled vital information on the state of development of the German radar to be discovered. The full story, along with graphic, first-hand descriptions of the South Saskatchewan Regiment's actions during the raid are told in James Leasor's book, "Green Beach".

Headquarters and all companies were in Estevan. The regiment was reduced to nil strength and placed in the Supplementary Order of Battle on 1 September 1968. The Queen's and Regimental Colours were deposited at Estevan Comprehensive School in 1969.

== Lineage ==
Lineage chart

1905	Regt of infy
1907	95th Regt
1909	95th Saskatchewan Rifles
1912	95th Saskatchewan Rifles	105th Regt
1913	60th Rifles of Canada
1915	152nd "Overseas" Bn, CEF
1916	Absorbed by 32nd Reserve Bn
1920	1st Bn (28th Bn, CEF), The South Saskatchewan Regt	2nd Bn (46th Bn, CEF), The South Saskatchewan Regt	3rd Bn, The South Saskatchewan Regt	4th Bn, The South Saskatchewan Regt	5th Bn, The South Saskatchewan Regt
1924	The Regina Rifle Regt	The King's Own Rifles of Canada	1st Bn (217th Bn, CEF), The Weyburn Regt	2nd Bn, (Note: Reserve order of battle) The Weyburn Regt	The Assiniboia Regt	1st Bn (152nd Bn, CEF), The Saskatchewan Border Regt	2nd Bn, The Saskatchewan Border Regt
1936	Disbanded	Disbanded
1936	The South Saskatchewan Regt
1939	The South Saskatchewan Regt, CASF
1940	1st Bn, The South Saskatchewan Regt, CASF
1941	2nd (Reserve) Bn, The South Saskatchewan Regt
1945	Disbanded	The South Saskatchewan Regt
1968	Supplementary Order of Battle

== Perpetuations ==
- 152nd Battalion (Weyburn-Estevan), CEF

== Battle honours ==
The regiment possesses the following battle honours: (Note: Battle honours in small capitals are for large operations and campaigns and those in lowercase are for more specific battles. Entries displayed in bold type are honours that are authorized to be shown on the regimental colour.)

The regimental colour

=== First World War ===
- Arras, 1917
- Hill 70

=== Second World War ===
- Dieppe
- Bourguébus Ridge
- St. André sur Orne
- Falaise
- Falaise Road
- The Laison
- Forêt de la Londe
- Dunkirk, 1944
- Antwerp–Turnhout Canal
- The Scheldt
- Woensdrecht
- South Beveland
- The Rhineland
- The Hochwald
- Xanten
- The Rhine
- Groningen
- Oldenburg
- North-West Europe 1942, 1944–45

== Alliances ==
The regiment was formerly allied with these regiments, but these alliances automatically expired when the British regiments amalgamated with other regiments.

- - The Royal Warwickshire Fusiliers
- - The King's Own Royal Border Regiment.

== Notable members ==
- Charles Cecil Ingersoll Merritt VC ED
- Joseph Gregory MM

== Music ==
The regimental march was "The Warwickshire Lads". A popular song about the regiment was "We're the boys of the S.S.R.", with words by Isabel McCrae Parker and music by Arthur Clare Parker. It was published in Weyburn by A.C. Parker, circa 1939 and was dedicated to the officers and men of the South Saskatchewan Regiment. First line: "We're the boys who have gathered from near and far".

== Media ==
- G. B. Buchanan (1956). The March of the Prairie Men: A Story of the South Saskatchewan Regiment. Ottawa.

== Literature ==
- Leasor, J. (1975). Green Beach. London: Heinemann. ISBN 0-434-41024-1. OCLC 1354236.
- Hayes, Geoffrey (2017). Crerar's Lieutenants. Vancouver, BC Canada: UBC Press. ISBN 978-0-7748-3484-1.
