= Moosomin, Saskatchewan =

Town in Saskatchewan, Canada

Moosomin
- Town
- Motto: The Town on the Move
- Location of Moosomin in Saskatchewan Moosomin (Canada)
- Coordinates: 50°08′37″N 101°40′03″W
- Country: Canada
- Province: Saskatchewan
- Census division: 5
- Rural municipality: Moosomin No. 121
- Post office Founded: 1882
- Incorporated (Village): 1882

Government
  - Mayor: Murray Gray
  - Town Manager: Paul Listrom
  - Governing body: Moosomin Town Council
  - MLA: Kevin Weedmark

Area
  - Total: 7.59 km^{2} (2.93 sq mi)

Population (2023)
  - Total: 2,882
  - Density: 327.5/km^{2} (848/sq mi)
- Time zone: UTC−6 (CST)
- Postal code: S0G 3N0
- Area code: 306
- Highways: Highway 1 (TCH); Highway 8
- Website: www.moosomin.com

Moosomin (/ˈmuːsəmɪn/) is a town in southern Saskatchewan founded in 1882. It is about 20 kilometres (12 mi) west of the provincial boundary between Saskatchewan and Manitoba.

== History ==
With the arrival of the Canadian Pacific Railway in 1882, Moosomin was established as the first Saskatchewan community on "steel". Originally known as "siding No. 4" and the "Moosomin Station", businesses began to establish and by 1884 the community had grown to include five general stores, five hotels, two livery stables, two blacksmiths, a doctor, a lawyer, butcher, and one printer, among other businesses. Moosomin was incorporated as a town in November 1887. R. D. McNaughton was the first merchant to arrive in Moosomin. He founded the R. D. McNaughton Company, a general store operation that played a vital role in early settlement.

The town was named after Chief Moosomin, who became well known for leading his band into treaty status. He signed Treaty 6 at Battleford in 1880.

The first issue of the Moosomin Courier weekly newspaper was published on Thursday, October 2, 1884. The newspaper has been published weekly since 1884 and is now known as the World-Spectator. It is the oldest community newspaper in the province.

There were several military units associated with Moosomin. These included the 16th Light Horse, in the early 1900s (decade); 10th Regiment, Canadian Mounted Rifles, 1915; 217th Battalion, CEF, and the 101st Battery of the 22nd Field Regiment which was based at Moosomin Armories (presently the Community Hall).

Moosomin also had a jail, the Moosomin Gaol, which is at the site of the present day Turpie Farm. In 1905, a hospital opened, and it was the only hospital between Brandon and Indian Head.

One of Moosomin's more notables is General Andrew McNaughton, born in Moosomin in 1887. In the Second World War, he commanded Canada's overseas army and then became Minister of Defence. In the interwar years he was Chairman of the National Research Council and following the Second World War was Chairman of the International Joint Commission which handled questions pertaining to the international waters along the Canada-United States border.

The social life of the early settlers of the area was limited by distances and transportation methods. Sunday church services were often held in private homes. The small one room school houses became the centre of activity in most areas. Saturday nights were often the social night of the week, when groceries and supplies were purchased. There was often entertainment in the Opera House in the R.D. McNaughton Store. Summer picnics were held in the period between summerfallowing and haying. July 1 in Moosomin was the highlight of the summer for many years, there would be a parade, sports events and refreshments. With the arrival of the automobile, social life changed accordingly.

== Current development ==
Moosomin grew significantly in the late 1960s and early 1970s with the construction of a major potash mine 35 kilometres (22 mi) to the north. Moosomin was undergoing significant growth around 2010. According to Saskatchewan Health, which tracks population based on the number of health cards issued, there were 2,733 people living in Moosomin on June 30, 2010, up from 2,496 a year earlier, an increase of 227 people. The growth is due to several reasons. The PotashCorp Rocanville potash mine just north of the community is undergoing a $2.8 billion expansion, the $60 million Red Lily Wind Farm just west of the community started producing power in February 2011, since the Trans-Canada Highway was twinned through Moosomin in November 2009 several new businesses have been established along the highway, the Southeast Integrated Care Centre has become a major health care centre for a large region of south-eastern Saskatchewan and south-western Manitoba, and there has been significant activity in the local oil patch, which is at the northern end of the Bakken Formation.

Several major projects are on the drawing board in Moosomin. Land has been purchased for two major hotel developments next to the Canalta Hotel, which opened in 2010 facing the new highway, and land has been purchased for Pipestone Villas, a major residential development. Fourteen kilometres south of Moosomin is Moosomin Lake and Moosomin Lake Regional Park.

== Demographics ==
In the 2021 Census of Population conducted by Statistics Canada, Moosomin had a population of 2,657 living in 1,102 of its 1,207 total private dwellings, a change of −3.1% from its 2016 population of 2,743. With a land area of 7.15 km^{2} (2.76 sq mi), it had a population density of 371.6/km^{2} (962.5/sq mi) in 2021.

Canada census – Moosomin community profile

	2021	2011
Population	2,657 (-3.1% from 2016)	2,485 (9.9% from 2006)
Land area	7.15 km^{2} (2.76 sq mi)	7.59 km^{2} (2.93 sq mi)
Population density	371.5/km^{2} (962/sq mi)	327.5/km^{2} (848/sq mi)
Median age	41.2 (M: 40.0, F: 42.4)	41.2 (M: 38.6, F: 43.8)
Private dwellings	1,207 (total) 1,102 (occupied)	1,168 (total)
Median household income	$83,000

References: 2021 2011

== Climate ==
Climate data for Moosomin (1981–2010)
Month	Jan	Feb	Mar	Apr	May	Jun	Jul	Aug	Sep	Oct	Nov	Dec	Year
Record high °C (°F)	10.5 (50.9)	15.5 (59.9)	21.7 (71.1)	33.5 (92.3)	36.5 (97.7)	38.9 (102.0)	41.1 (106.0)	38.0 (100.4)	35.6 (96.1)	33.0 (91.4)	24.4 (75.9)	17.5 (63.5)	41.1 (106.0)
Mean daily maximum °C (°F)	−10.1 (13.8)	−6.4 (20.5)	−0.2 (31.6)	10.4 (50.7)	18.0 (64.4)	22.7 (72.9)	25.2 (77.4)	24.9 (76.8)	17.9 (64.2)	9.8 (49.6)	−1.6 (29.1)	−9.3 (15.3)	8.4 (47.2)
Daily mean °C (°F)	−14.9 (5.2)	−11 (12)	−4.9 (23.2)	4.4 (39.9)	11.5 (52.7)	16.4 (61.5)	18.8 (65.8)	18.2 (64.8)	11.8 (53.2)	4.6 (40.3)	−5.6 (21.9)	−13.5 (7.7)	3.0 (37.4)
Mean daily minimum °C (°F)	−19.5 (−3.1)	−15.5 (4.1)	−9.5 (14.9)	−1.7 (28.9)	5.0 (41.0)	10.1 (50.2)	12.2 (54.0)	11.4 (52.5)	5.6 (42.1)	−0.7 (30.7)	−9.5 (14.9)	−17.8 (0.0)	−2.5 (27.5)
Record low °C (°F)	−43.9 (−47.0)	−41.1 (−42.0)	−36.7 (−34.1)	−23.3 (−9.9)	−15 (5)	−3.3 (26.1)	1.1 (34.0)	−3.3 (26.1)	−11.1 (12.0)	−20 (−4)	−33.9 (−29.0)	−41.5 (−42.7)	−43.9 (−47.0)
Average precipitation mm (inches)	21.1 (0.83)	14.8 (0.58)	25.8 (1.02)	24.3 (0.96)	65.7 (2.59)	90.5 (3.56)	77.7 (3.06)	64.3 (2.53)	56.0 (2.20)	35.0 (1.38)	20.4 (0.80)	19.4 (0.76)	515 (20.27)
Source: Environment Canada

== Sports ==
Moosomin is home to the Moosomin Rangers of the Big 6 Hockey League. The Rangers have won three Big 6 Championships, with the most recent title coming in the 2025–2026 season, where the Rangers defeated the Redvers Rockets in 5 games. The Rangers won the Big Six in 2023-2024 season and in 2003-2004 season. The Rangers switched different leagues in between the 2003/04 & 23/24 championships. The Rangers won the 2014/2015 North Central Manitoba League Championship. Rangers were in the Central Manitoba League from 2014/15 to 2019/20 seasons. The Rangers were also in the Triangle Hockey League from 2005/06 to 2013/14 Seasons. The Rangers were in the SaskEast League during the 2020/21 season but only played a handful of games due to the COVID Pandemic. Ever since, the Rangers have been in the Big Six. The town is also the home of the Moosomin Badgers, which is in the Saskota Baseball League. The Badgers started in the 2023 Saskota season. Moosomin Steelhawks, formerly of the Prairie Junior Hockey League, played in the 2025–2026 season.

== Notable residents ==
- Jessica Campbell (born 1992), ice hockey player and coach
- Brock Lesnar (born 1977), professional wrestler and mixed martial artist
- Andrew McNaughton (1887–1966), former Chief of the General Staff of the Canadian Army
- George Mullin (1891-1963), recipient of the Victoria Cross
- John Ryerson Neff, (1844-1913), politician
- Frederick Ralph Sharp (1915–1992), former Chief of the Defence Staff of the Canadian Forces
- Dave Tippett (born 1961), ice hockey player and coach
- Daemon Hunt (born 2002), ice hockey player

== See also ==
- List of population centres in Saskatchewan
- List of communities in Saskatchewan
- List of place names in Canada of Indigenous origin
- List of towns in Saskatchewan
