= 32nd Battalion, CEF =

Canadian infantry battalion

The 32nd Battalion, CEF, was an infantry battalion of the Canadian Expeditionary Force during the Great War.

== History ==
The battalion was authorized on 3 November 1914 and embarked for Britain on 23 February 1915. It was redesignated as the 32nd Reserve Battalion, CEF on 18 April 1915. It absorbed the 195th Battalion (City of Regina) (now perpetuated by the Royal Regina Rifles) in November 1916. On 4 January 1917 its personnel were absorbed by the 15th Reserve Battalion, CEF, to provide reinforcements for the Canadian Corps in the field. The battalion disbanded on 1 September 1917.

The 32nd Battalion recruited in Manitoba and Saskatchewan and was mobilized at Winnipeg.

The 32nd Battalion had three Officers Commanding:

- Lt.-Col. H.J. Cowan, 7 March 1915 – 15 September 1915
- Lt.-Col. C.D. MacPherson, 15 September 1915 – 1 August 1916
- Lt.-Col. F.J. Clarke, 2 August 1916 – 2 January 1917

In 1929, the 32nd Battalion was awarded the battle honour "The Great War, 1915–17".

== Perpetuation ==
The 32nd Battalion, CEF, is perpetuated by The 12th Manitoba Dragoons, currently on the Supplementary Order of Battle.

== See also ==
- List of infantry battalions in the Canadian Expeditionary Force

== Sources ==
- Canadian Expeditionary Force 1914-1919 by Col. G.W.L. Nicholson, CD, Queen's Printer, Ottawa, Ontario, 1962
