= List of glaciers in Svalbard =

This is a list of glaciers in Svalbard. It includes glaciers and ice caps in Svalbard, Norway.

== List of glaciers and ice caps ==
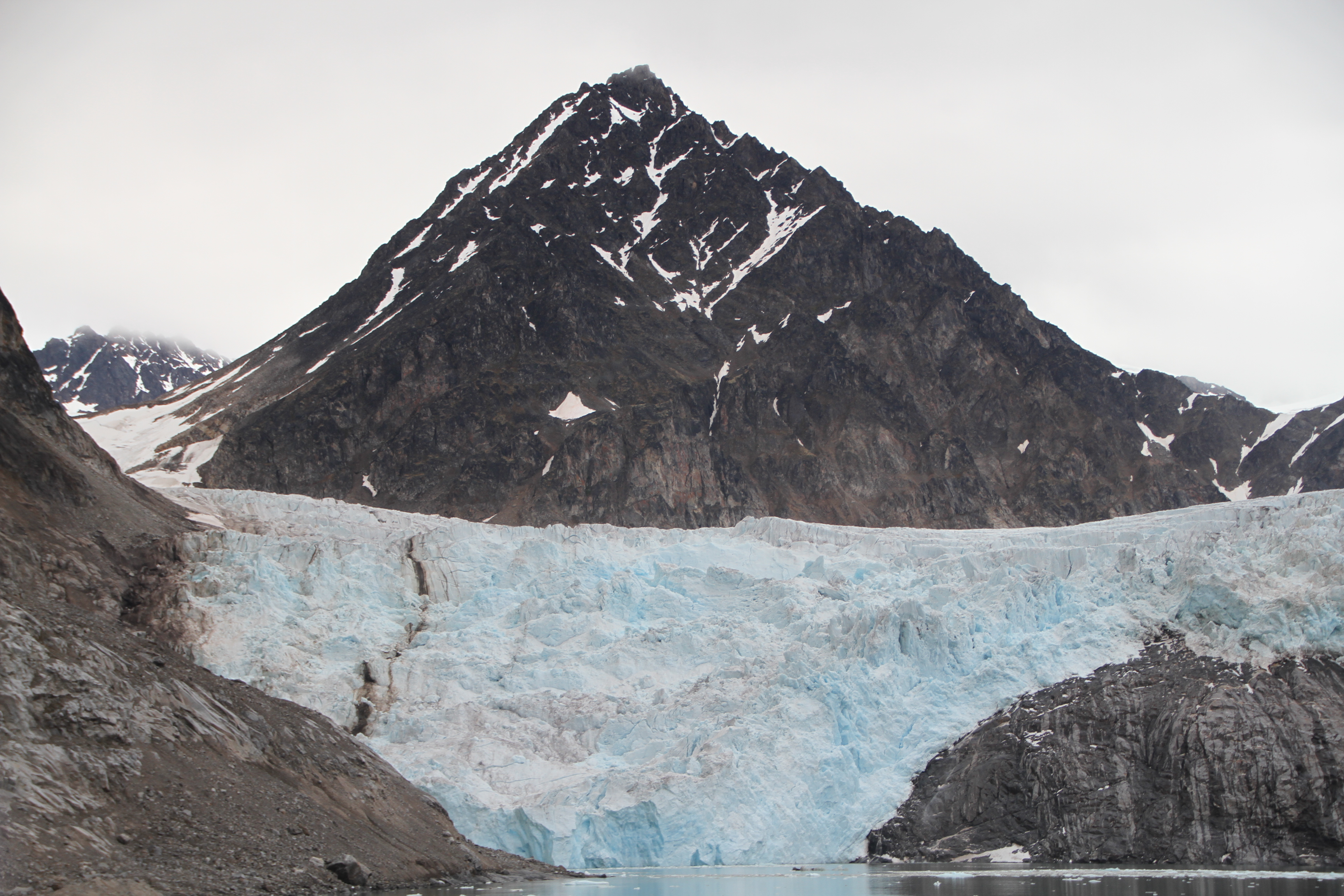
View of Tinayrebreen in Haakon VII Land.

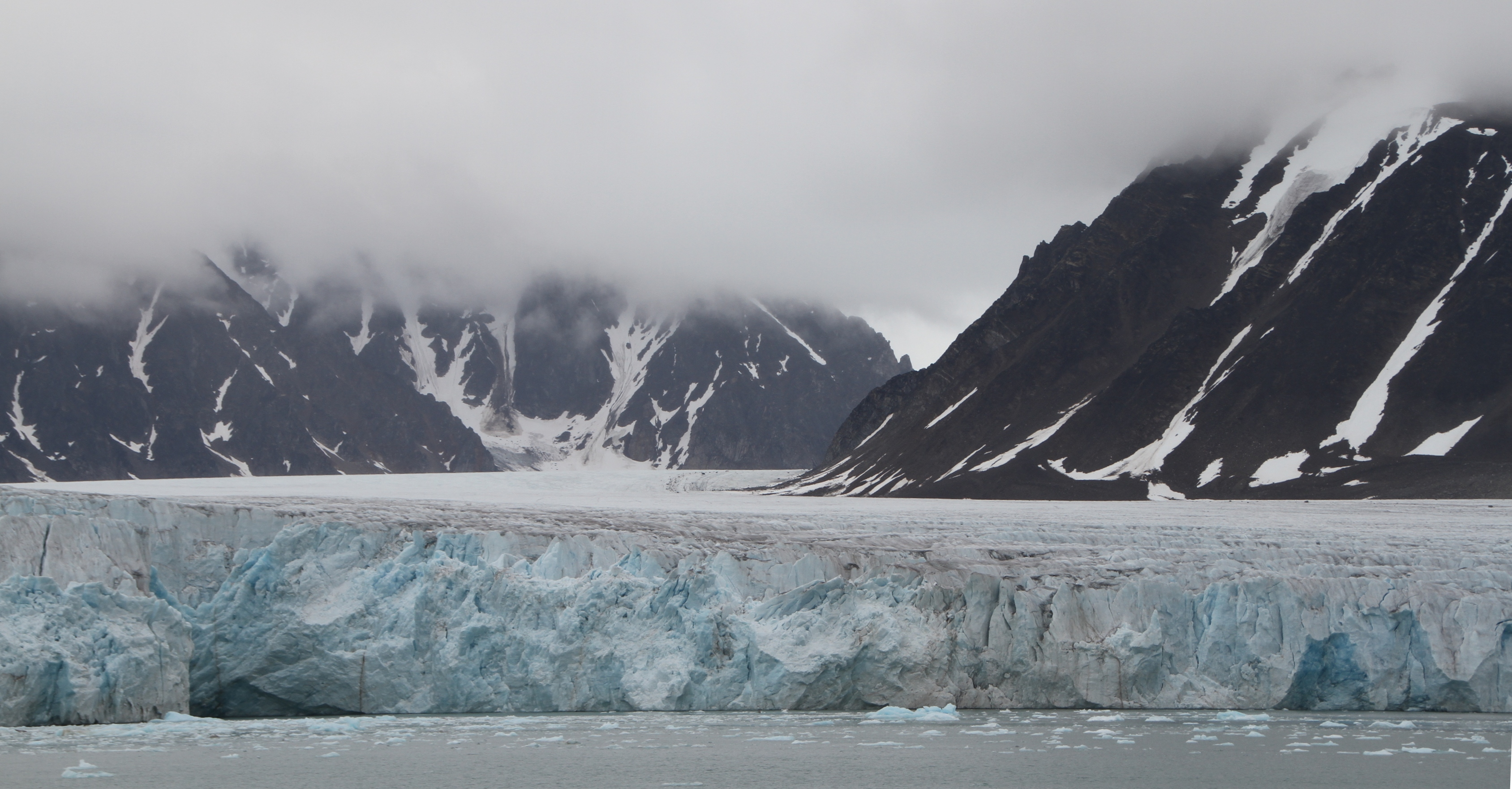
Bjørlykkebreen; inner Lilliehöökbreen, Albert I Land.

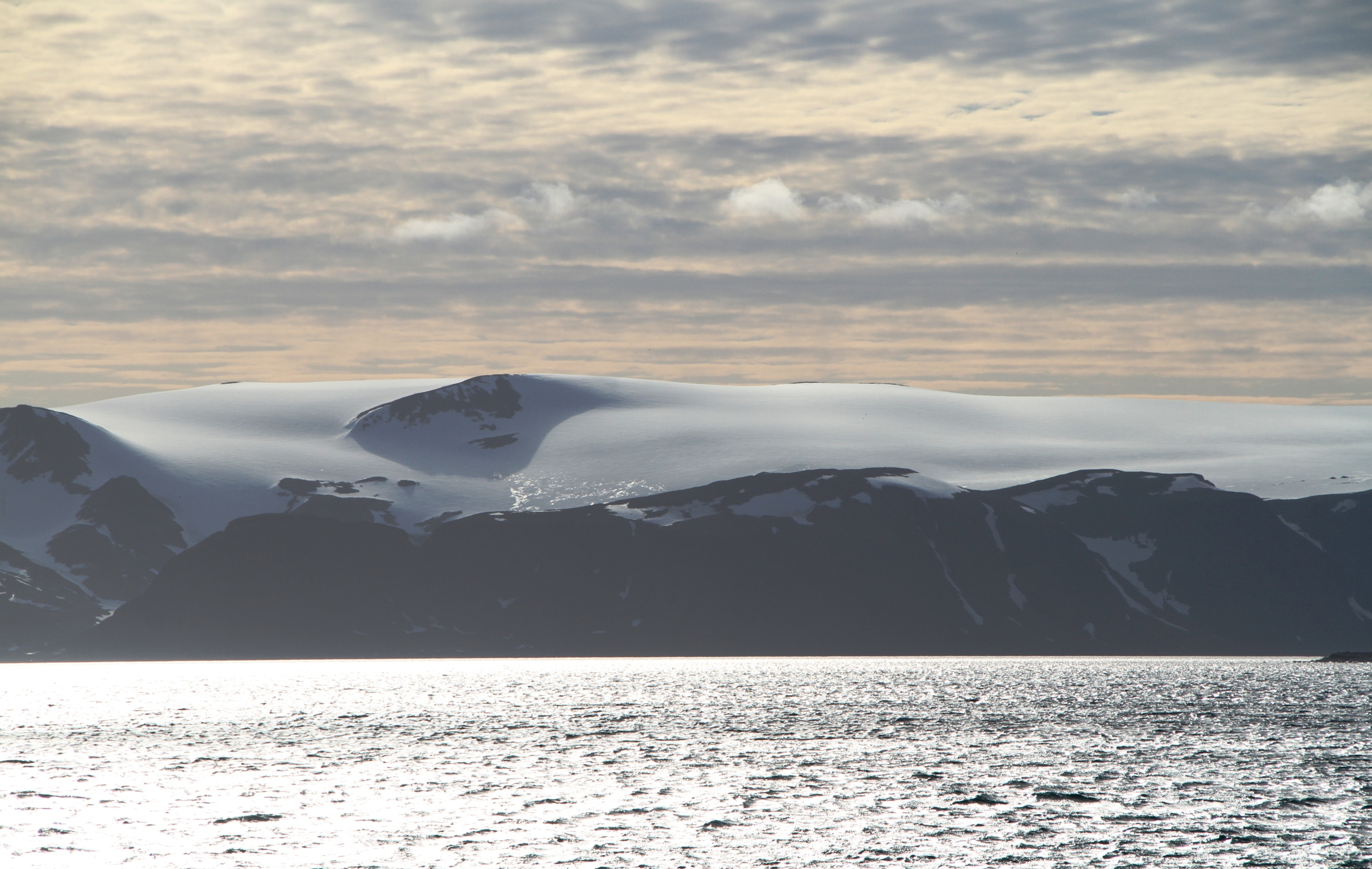
The Biscayarfonna ice cap seen from the coast.

=== Ice caps ===
- Austfonna
- Biscayarfonna
- Glitnefonna
- Lomonosovfonna
- Løvenskioldfonna
- Valhallfonna
- Vegafonna
- Vestfonna

=== Glaciers ===
- Aavatsmarkbreen
- Abrahamsenbreen
- Adambreen
- Adolfbreen
- Akademikarbreen
- Aldegondabreen
- Angelbreen
- Antoniabreen
- Arbobreen
- Arlabreen
- Arneliusbreen
- Åsgardfonna
- Austgötabreen
- Austjøkulen
- Bakaninbreen
- Balderfonna
- Barentsjøkulen
- Belopol'skijbreen
- Besselsbreen
- Bjørlykkebreen
- Bjørnbreen
- Blomstrandbreen
- Borebreen
- Bragebreen
- Bråsvellbreen
- Brazybreen
- Buchananisen
- Buchanbreen
- Bullbreen
- Bungebreen
- Charlesbreen
- Charpentierbreen
- Chauveaubreen
- Chomjakovbreen
- Chydeniusbreen
- Comfortlessbreen
- Dahlbreen
- Deltabreen
- Devikbreen
- Dollfusbreen
- Duckwitzbreen
- Dunderdalsbreen
- Edgeøyjøkulen
- Eidembreen
- Elfenbeinbreen
- Erdmannbreen
- Esmarkbreen
- Etonbreen
- Fimbulisen
- Fjortende Julibreen
- Flakbreen
- Foldnutfonna
- Foxfonna
- Fredfonna
- Freemanbreen
- Fridtjovbreen
- Frysjabreen
- Gaffelbreen
- Garnbreen
- Gimlebreen
- Glasiologbreen
- Gråkallbreen
- Gullybreen
- Haakenbreen
- Hakebreen
- Hambergbreen
- Hansbreen
- Hayesbreen
- Hedgehogfonna
- Heksebreen
- Hellefonna
- Hinlopenbreen
- Hochstetterbreen
- Hollertoppen
- Holtedahlfonna
- Hornbreen
- Hübnerbreen
- Huldrebreen
- Hydrografbreen
- Isachsenfonna
- Keilhaubreen
- Kennedybreen
- Kjerulfbreen
- Kongsvegen glacier
- Königsbergbreen
- Konowbreen
- Krøkjebreen
- Kronebreen
- Krylbreen
- Kumulusbreen
- Kvalpyntfonna
- Kvitbreen
- Kvitøyjøkulen
- Kvitskarvbreen
- Langlibreen
- Leighbreen
- Liestølbreen
- Lilliehöökbreen
- Linnébreen
- Lisbetbreen
- Longstaffbreen
- Longyearbreen
- Løvliebreen
- Løyndbreen
- Luitpoldbreen
- Lundbreen
- Lyngebreen
- Makarovbreen
- Markhambreen
- Martinbreen
- Mathewbreen
- Mathiasbreen
- Mayerbreen
- Mefonna
- Mendeleevbreen
- Miethebreen
- Mittag-Lefflerbreen
- Monacobreen
- Nansenbreen
- Nathorstbreen
- Negribreen
- Norddomen
- Nordenskiöldbreen
- Nordmannsfonna
- Olav V Land
- Olsokbreen
- Osbornebreen
- Øydebreen
- Palanderisen
- Passfjellbreen
- Paulabreen
- Paulbreen
- Paxbreen
- Penckbreen
- Petersbreen
- Presidentbreen
- Rabotbreen
- Ramondbreen
- Randbreen
- Raudfjordbreen
- Recherchebreen
- Renardbreen
- Richterbreen
- Rijpbreen
- Rosenthalbreen
- Rundisen
- Sagtindbreen
- Samarinbreen
- Scheelebreen
- Scheibreen
- Scottbreen
- Sefströmbreen
- Seligerbreen
- Serlabreen
- Sjettebreen
- Skarpegbreen
- Skilfonna
- Skonrokkbreen
- Skruisbreen
- Smeerenburgbreen
- Snödombreen
- Snøkuvbreen
- Sørdomen
- Sørkappfonna
- St. Nikolausbreen
- Stallobreen
- Steenstrupbreen
- Steindolpbreen
- Stonebreen
- Storbreen
- Storøyjøkulen
- Svalbreen
- Svalisbreen
- Sveabreen
- Sveigbreen
- Svitjodbreen
- Sykorabreen
- Sysselmannbreen
- Tavlebreen
- Tessinbreen
- Tinayrebreen
- Torellbreen
- Torsfonna
- Tromsøbreen
- Tunabreen
- Tverrbreen
- Ulvebreen
- Usherbreen
- Uvêrsbreen
- Valettebreen
- Varderyggfonna
- Vasil'evbreen
- Vegardbreen
- Venernbreen
- Vestgötabreen
- Vestjøkulen
- Veteranen
- Vintervegen
- Vitkovskijbreen
- Von Postbreen
- Vonbreen
- Waggonwaybreen
- Wahlenbergbreen
- Willybreen
- Winsnesbreen

== See also ==
- List of glaciers in Europe
- List of glaciers in Norway
