= Julhøgda =

Coordinates: 76.9404°N 16.3705°E

Julhøgda (The Christmas Height) is a mountain in Sørkapp Land at Spitsbergen, Svalbard. It has a height of 667 m.a.s.l. and is located on the mountain ridge Påskefjella, east of Samarinbreen and Samarinvågen, and west of the glacier Chomjakovbreen. Neighbour peaks are Påsketoppen to the south and Meranfjellet to the north.
