= Blomstrandhamna =

Bay in Haakon VII Land at Spitsbergen, Svalbard

Coordinates: 79.006°N 12.096°E

Blomstrandhamna is a bay in Haakon VII Land at Spitsbergen, Svalbard. It is located at the northern side of Kongsfjorden, north of Blomstrandhalvøya. The bay splits into the two branches Nordvågen and Sørvågen. Blomstrandhamna is connected with Dyrevika east of Blomstrandhalvøya. The connecting strait was earlier covered by the glacier Blomstrandbreen, and emerged after recent retreat of the glacier. A skerry in Blomstrandhamna and surrounding waters was included in the Blomstrandhamna Bird Sanctuary in 1973, covering an area of 0.58 square kilometers.
