= Påsketoppen =

Mountain in Sørkapp Land at Spitsbergen, Svalbard

Coordinates: 76.9284°N 16.3875°E

Påsketoppen is a mountain in Sørkapp Land at Spitsbergen, Svalbard. It has a height of 812 m.a.s.l. and is located on the mountain ridge Påskefjella, east of Samarinbreen and Samarinvågen, and west of Chomjakovbreen. Neighbour peaks are Pinsetoppen to the south and Julhøgda to the north.
