= Presidentbreen =

Glacier in Svalbard, Norway

Coordinates: 79.220°N 12.296°E

Presidentbreen ("The President Glacier") is a glacier in Haakon VII Land at Spitsbergen, Svalbard. The glacier is a tributary to the Tinayrebreen, and is surrounded by the mountains of Presidenten, Monarken, Kiliantoppen, Snødomen and Fallièresfjella.
