= Kiliantoppen =

Mountain in Svalbard, Norway

Coordinates: 79°14′11″N 12°20′31″E

Kiliantoppen is a mountain in Haakon VII Land at Spitsbergen, Svalbard. The mountain has a height of 1284 m.a.s.l. and is located east of the bay of Möllerfjorden, between the glaciers of Presidentbreen and Mayerbreen. It is named after French geologist Charles Wilfrid Kilian.
