= Tinayrebukta =

Bay in Haakon VII Land at Spitsbergen, Svalbard

Coordinates: 79.20°N 12.12°E

Tinayrebukta is a bay in Haakon VII Land at Spitsbergen, Svalbard. It is located at the east side of Möllerfjorden, and is surrounded by the mountains of Fallièresfjella and Generalfjella. The glacier of Tinayrebreen debouches into the bay. The bay is named after French painter Jean Paul Louis Tinayre.
