= Generalfjella =

Mountain group of Spitsbergen, Svalbard

Coordinates: 79.17°N 12.08°E

Generalfjella is a mountain group in Haakon VII Land at Spitsbergen, Svalbard. It is located east of Krossfjorden, between the bay of Tinayrebukta and the glacier of D'Arodesbreen. The mountain group is named after Norwegian army general Ole Hansen.

Among the mountains of the group are Tverrkammen, Ole Hansenkammen and Austflanken.
