= Snødomen =

Mountain in Svalbard, Norway

Coordinates: 79°14′06″N 12°13′17″E

Snødomen ("The Snow Dome") is a mountain in Haakon VII Land at Spitsbergen, Svalbard. The mountain has a height of 1,215 m.a.s.l. and is located east of the bay of Möllerfjorden, between the glaciers of Mayerbreen and Tinayrebreen.
