= Bjørlykkebreen =

Glacier in Svalbard, Norway

Bjørlykke Glacier
- Bjørlykkebreen
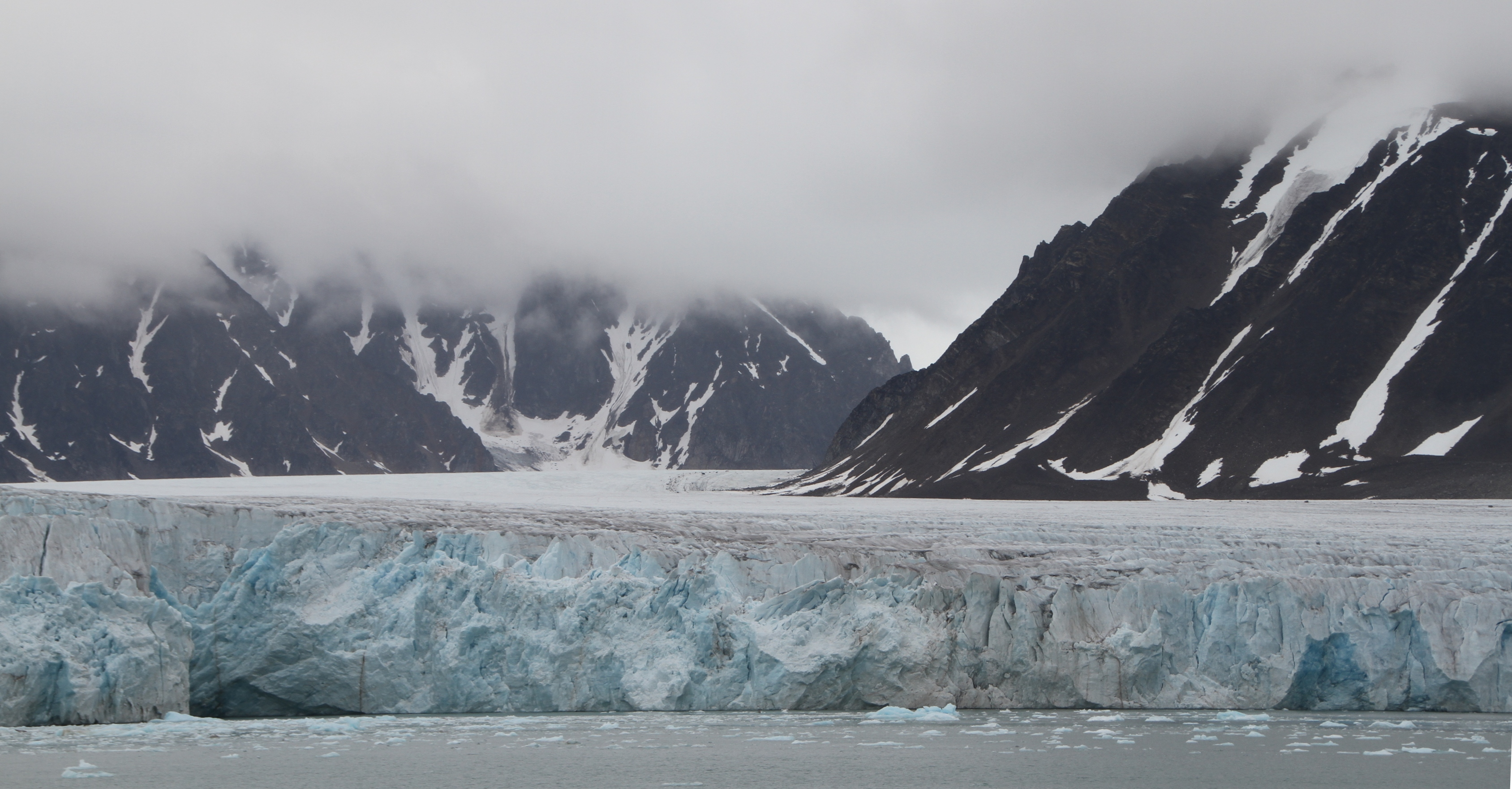
- View of Bjørlykkebreen; inner Lilliehöökbreen

- Location within Svalbard
- Location: Albert I Land; Spitsbergen, Svalbard
- Coordinates: 79°22′01″N 11°59′43″E
- Terminus: Lilliehöökfjorden; Greenland Sea

Bjørlykkebreen (Bjørlykke Glacier) is a glacier in Albert I Land, Spitsbergen, Svalbard. It is a tributary of Lillehöökbreen, and is debouching into the Lilliehöökfjorden. The glacier is named after Norwegian geologist Knut Olai Bjørlykke (1860 – 1946) following a proposal in 1912 by Adolf Hoel who had traversed the glacier in 1909 together with Olaf Holtedahl.

== See also ==
- List of glaciers in Svalbard
