= Mayerbukta =

Bay in Svalbard, Norway

Coordinates: 79.262°N 12.091°E

Mayerbukta is a bay in Haakon VII Land at Spitsbergen, Svalbard. It is located at the eastern side of Möllerfjorden, and has a width of about 1.5 kilometers. The glacier of Mayerbreen debouches into the bay. The bay is named after Louis Benoit Joseph Mayer, counsellor of Albert I, Prince of Monaco.
