= Påskefjella =

Mountain ridge in Svalbard, Norway

Coordinates: 76.9321°N 16.3740°E

Påskefjella (The Easter Mountains) is a mountain ridge in Sørkapp Land at Spitsbergen, Svalbard. It is located south of Hornsund, east of the bay Samarinvågen and glacier Samarinbreen, and west of Chomjakovbreen. The ridge comprises the mountains Tverraksla, Pinsetoppen, Påsketoppen, Julhøgda and Meranfjellet.
