= Biscayarfonna =

Ice cap in Svalbard, Norway

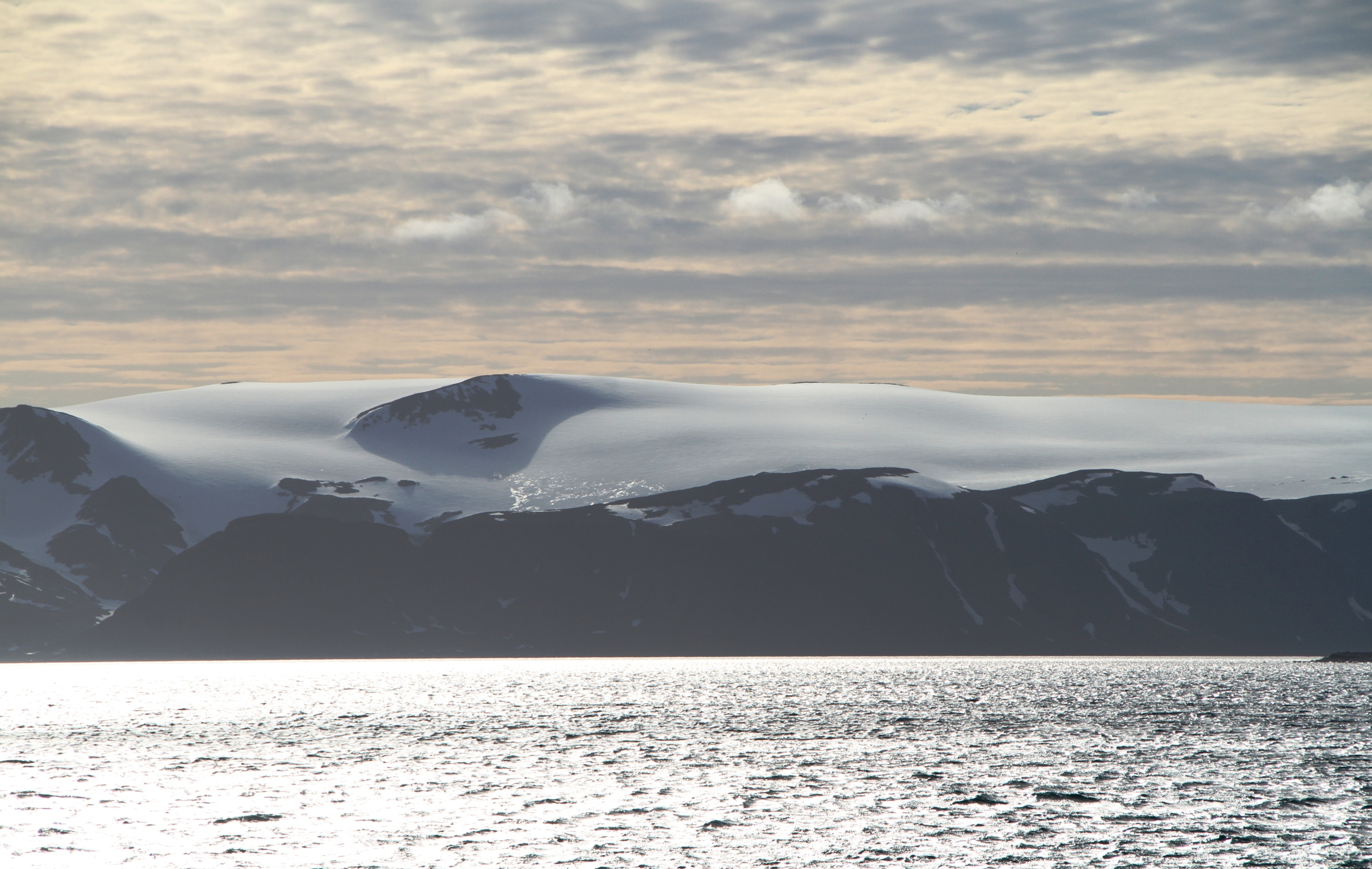
- View of Biscayarfonna from the sea

- Location within Svalbard
- Type: Plateau glacier
- Location: Haakon VII Land; Spitsbergen, Svalbard
- Coordinates: 79°47′N 12°17′E
- Terminus: Raudfjorden, Breibogen; Arctic Ocean

Biscayarfonna (Biscay glacier in Nynorsk) is an ice cap in Spitsbergen, Svalbard. It has an elevation of 467 m (1,532 ft), and is located on the Haakon VII Land peninsula between Raudfjorden in the west and Breibogen bay in the east. This ice cap is named after Biscay in honour of the Basque whalers who hunted at Spitsbergen in the 17th and 18th centuries.

== See also ==
- List of glaciers in Svalbard
