= Ole Hansen =

Ole Hansen may refer to:

- Ole Hansen (politician) (1855–1928), Danish politician
- Ole Hansen (officer) (1842–1922), Norwegian army officer
- Ole Christoffer Heieren Hansen (born 1987), Norwegian footballer
- Ole Jacob Hansen (1940–2000), Norwegian jazz musician

== See also ==
- Ole Hanson (1874–1940), American politician
