= Kong Haakons Halvøy =

Peninsula in Svalbard, Norway

Coordinates: 79.2668°N 11.7691°E

Kong Haakons Halvøy is a 12 kilometer long peninsula and mountain ridge in Haakon VII Land at Spitsbergen, Svalbard. The ridge forms a peninsula in the fjord Krossfjorden, and separates the fjord branches Lilliehöökfjorden and Möllerfjorden. The peninsula is named after King Haakon VII of Norway.
