= Pinsetoppen =

Coordinates: 76.9129°N 16.4089°E

Pinsetoppen ("The Whitsun Peak") is a mountain in Sørkapp Land at Spitsbergen, Svalbard. It has a height of 628 m.a.s.l. and is located on the mountain ridge Påskefjella, east of Samarinbreen. Neighbour peak is Påsketoppen further north.
