= Luitpoldbreen =

Glacier in Svalbard, Norway

Coordinates: 78.36°N 18.39°E

Luitpoldbreen is a glacier in Sabine Land at Spitsbergen, Svalbard. It is named after Luitpold, Prince Regent of Bavaria. The glacier is a tributary to Hayesbreen. The mountain of Jebensfjellet is surrounded by Luitpoldbreen, Hayesbreen and Königsbergbreen.
