= Eidsvollfjellet =

Mountain in Spitsbergen, Norway

Coordinates: 79.1606°N 13.3444°E

Eidsvollfjellet is a mountain in Haakon VII Land at Spitsbergen, Svalbard. The mountain has a height of 1,449 m.a.s.l. and is located between Vonbreen and Isachsenfonna, north of Snøfjella. Eidsvollfjellet is the highest mountain in Haakon VII Land.
