= Gedenovfjellet =

Coordinates: 76.8697°N 16.6950°E

Gedenovfjellet is a mountain ridge in Sørkapp Land at Spitsbergen, Svalbard. It has a length of about four kilometers, with a highest peak of 456 m.a.s.l. The ridge is located between Øydebreen and Austjøkulen. It is separated from the northern ridge Isryggen by the mountain pass Isryggpasset. The ridge is named after Russian astronomer Dmitrij Dmitrievich Gedenov.
