= Tverraksla =

Mountain in Svalbard, Norway

Coordinates: 76.9002°N 16.4395°E

Tverraksla is a mountain in Sørkapp Land at Spitsbergen, Svalbard. It has a height of 691 m.a.s.l. and is located on the mountain ridge Påskefjella, west of the glacier Chomjakovbreen.
