= Mayerbreen =

Glacier in Svalbard, Norway

Coordinates: 79.254°N 12.332°E

Mayerbreen is a glacier in Haakon VII Land at Spitsbergen, Svalbard. The glacier has a length of about twelve kilometers. It originates from Neubauerfjellet, and debouches into the bay of Mayerbukta in Möllerfjorden. The glacier is named after Louis Benoit Joseph Mayer, counsellor of Albert I, Prince of Monaco. The mountain of Snødomen is located between the glaciers of Mayerbreen and Tinayrebreen.
