= Fallièresfjella =

Mountain group in Spitsbergen, Norway

Coordinates: 79.213°N 12.181°E

Fallièresfjella is a mountain group in Haakon VII Land at Spitsbergen, Svalbard. It is located north of the bay of Tinayrebukta and the glacier of Tinayrebreen. The highest peak reaches a height of 1,039 m.a.s.l., and the mountain group has an extension of about six kilometers. The mountain group is named after French politician Armand Fallières.
