= Vestjøkulen =

Glacier in Svalbard, Norway

Coordinates: 76.8736°N 16.4985°E

Vestjøkulen is a glacier in Sørkapp Land at Spitsbergen, Svalbard. It is a tributary glacier to Samarinbreen, and is located west of the mountain ridge Bredichinryggen (with Austjøkulen at the opposite/eastern side of the ridge).
