= Reinsdyrflya =

Peninsula in Haakon VII Land at Spitsbergen, Svalbard, Norway

Coordinates: 79.7740°N 13.5070°E

Reinsdyrflya (Reindeer peninsula) is a peninsula in Haakon VII Land at Spitsbergen, Svalbard, Norway. It defines the western side of the outer part of Woodfjorden, and the northern side of the outer part of Liefdefjorden.

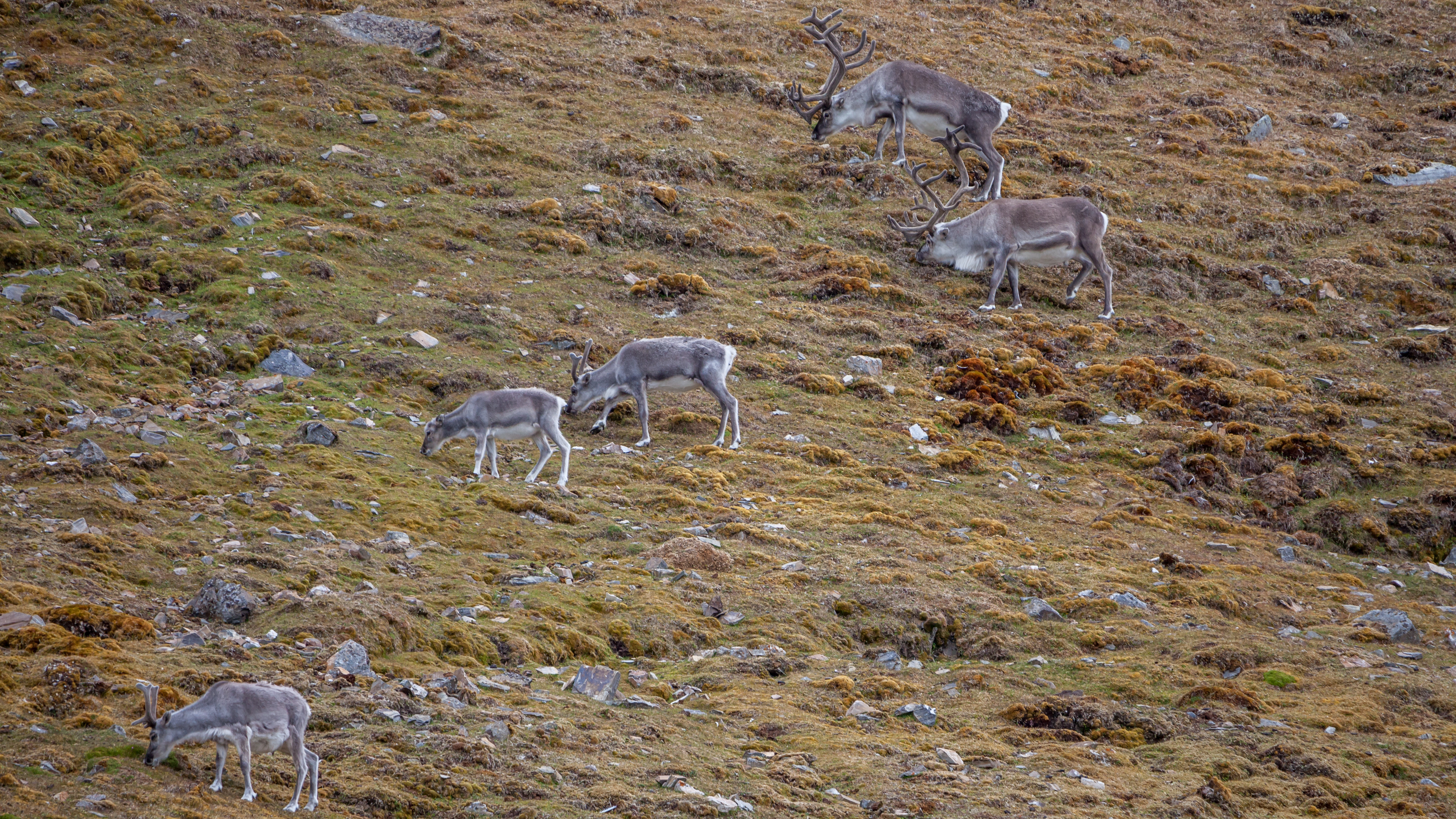
Svalbard reindeers (Rangifer tarandus platyrhynchus) in the Tundra of Reinsdyrflya
