= Kroghfjellet =

Mountain in the Norwegian archipelago of Svalbard

Coordinates: 78.294°N 18.808°E

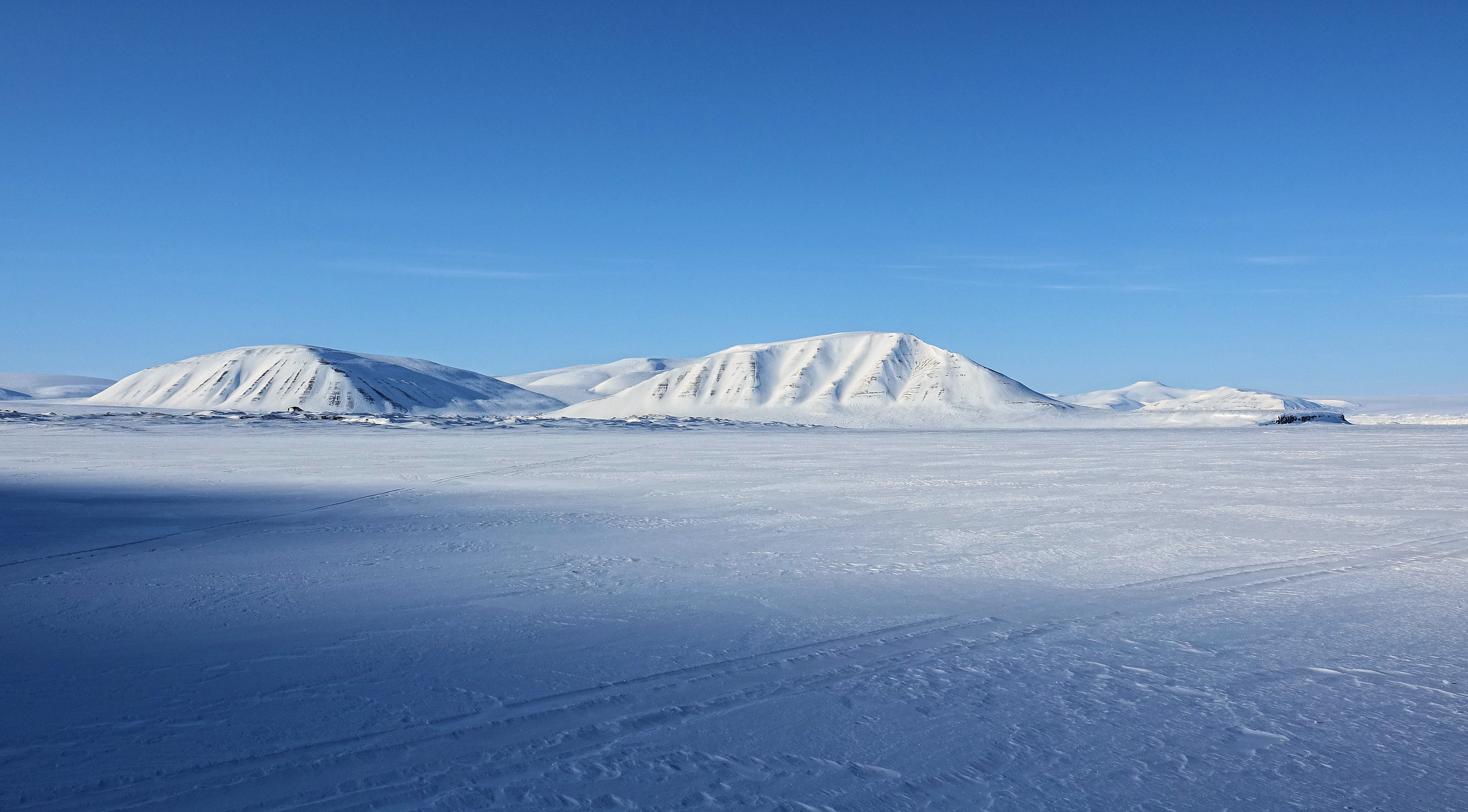
Kroghfjellet on Spitsbergen's east coast.

Kroghfjellet is a mountain in Sabine Land at Spitsbergen, Svalbard. It is located west of the bay of Mohnbukta and south of the glacier of Hayesbreen. The mountain has a length of about five kilometers. It is named after a German consul in Tromsø in the 1870s. The glacier of Usherbreen is located between Kroghfjellet and Domen.
