= Brendetoppane =

Mountain peaks in Spitsbergen, Norway

Coordinates: 76°55′21″N 16°49′38″E

Brendetoppane is a series of mountain peaks in Sørkapp Land at Spitsbergen, Svalbard. They are named after Karl Alfred Brende. The peaks are situated on a ridge between the glacier of Svalisbreen and Skilfonna. The ridge extends from the mountain pass of Svanhildpasset to Evapasset, and is partly covered by ice.
