= Gunnar Isachsen =

Norwegian military officer (1868–1939)

Gunnerius Ingvald Isachsen
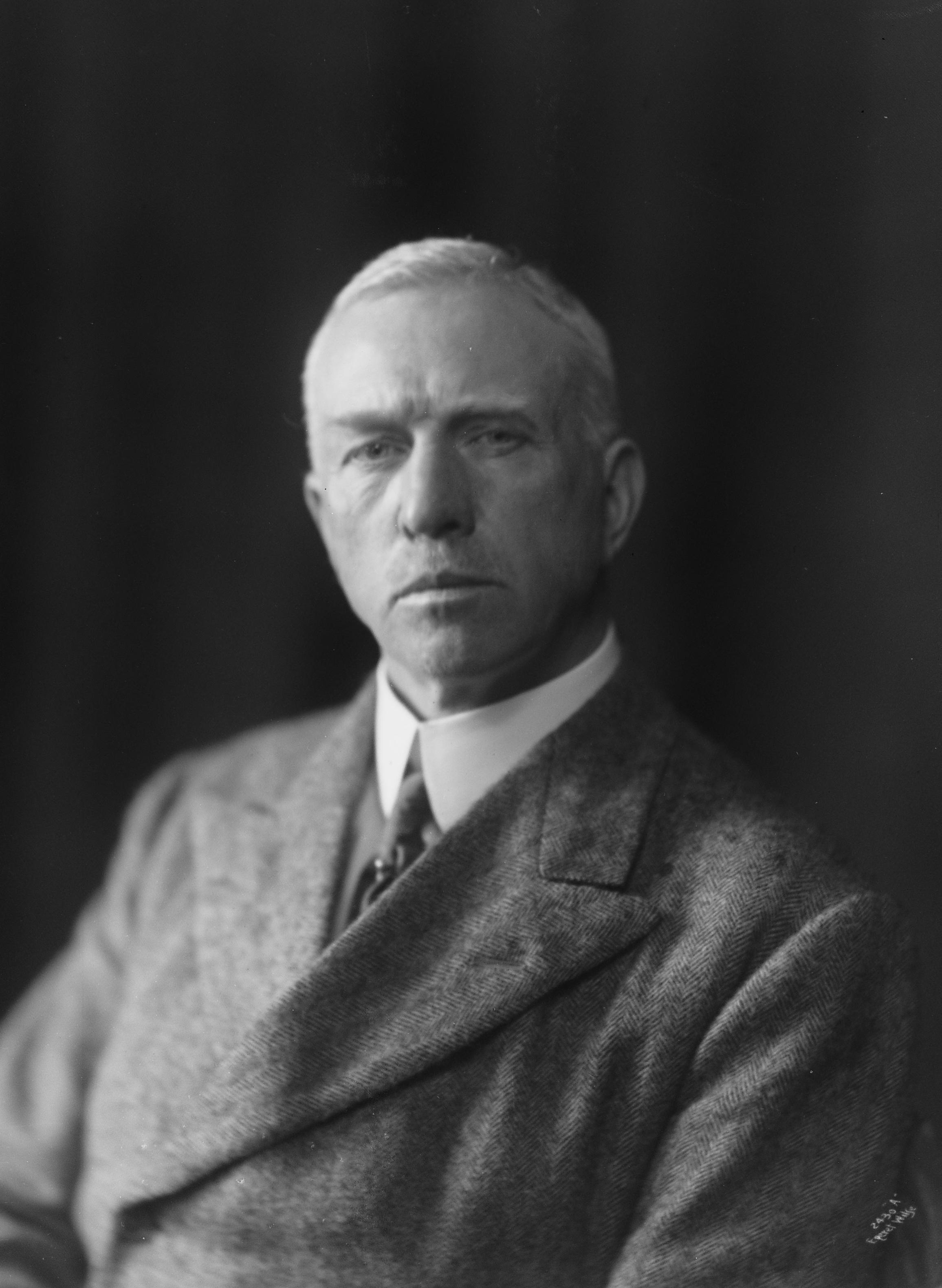
- Isachsen in 1921
- Born: 3 October 1868; Drøbak, Norway
- Died: 19 December 1939 (aged 71); Asker, Norway
- Military career
- Allegiance: Norway
- Branch: Cavalry
- Rank: Major
- Nickname: Gunnar Isachsen
- Other work: Polar scientist; First president of the Norwegian Maritime Museum

Gunnerius Ingvald Isachsen (3 October 1868 – 19 December 1939), was a Norwegian military officer and polar scientist. From 1923, he was the first president of the Norwegian Maritime Museum.

== Early years ==
He was born in Drøbak, Norway in 1868 and grew up there. His father was the shipmaster Nils Høgh Isachsen (1838–1913), and his mother was Marie Cecilie Sivertsen (1839–1909). His sister, Louise Isachsen, was a physician.

After passing the matriculation exam in 1888, he entered the Norwegian Military Academy.

== Career ==
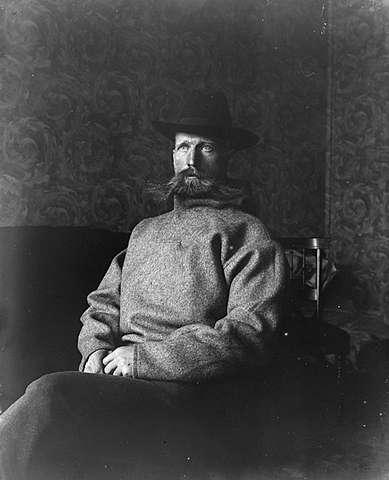
Isachsen after the Fram expedition

Isachsen was made a first lieutenant in the Norwegian cavalry in 1891. Gymnastics and sports keenly interested Isachsen, and he graduated from the gymnasium Central School in 1898, also taking courses at the Marine Observatory in Wilhelmshaven and the marine research in Bergen.

From 1898 to 1902, Isachsen was topographer on Otto Sverdrup's Fram expedition to the Arctic archipelago. During this voyage, he was promoted to Rittmester in 1899, and mapped large areas of hitherto unknown islands in Northern Canada, mainly by long sledge journeys. These included Ellef Ringnes Island, King Christian Island.

From 1903 to 1905, he participated in the French military service in Algeria and Paris. From 1906 to 1910, he led topographic and bathymetric research expeditions at Svalbard. These expeditions were paid for by Prince Albert of Monaco.

Isachsen led his own government-financed expeditions to Spitsbergen in 1909 and 1910. As a result of these expeditions, he founded the Norwegian systematic research work on Svalbard. In 1911, Isachsen was on assignment in Russia and Japan. Three years later, a fire destroyed his house in Asker, and with it all his maps and records. He served as a regular salaried officer to 1917. He was the Norwegian government's technical delegate to the Svalbard Treaty of Paris in 1914 and the Paris Peace Conference in 1919.

Isachsen visited the Faroe Islands and Iceland in 1922. In 1923, he became the director of the Norwegian Maritime Museum in Oslo, and in 1923 and 1924, he took part in expeditions to East Greenland . He was promoted to major in 1924, and participated in a special whaling mission to the Ross Sea in 1926–27. He was the government's whaling inspector in the Southern Ocean in 1929–30, and the leader of the fourth Norvegia expedition circumnavigating the South Pole in 1930–31.

== Personal life ==
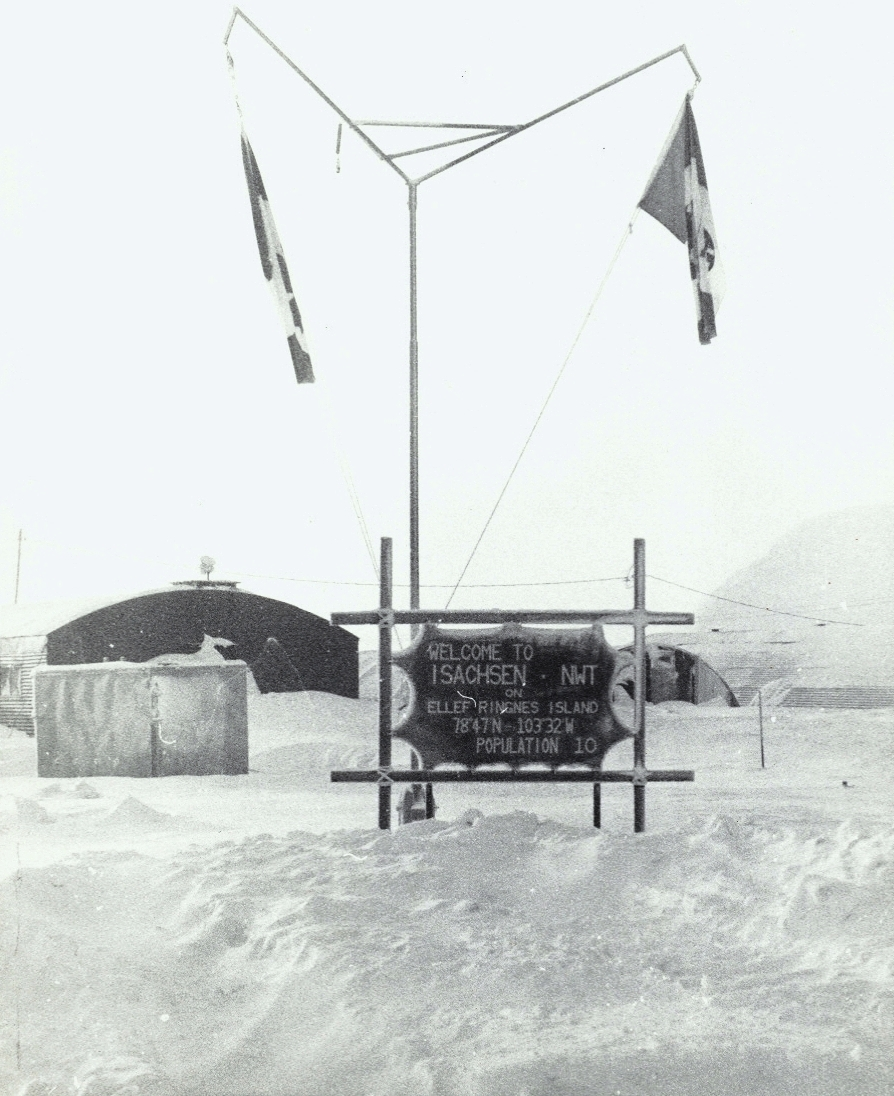
Welcome sign at Canada's Isachsen research station, 1974

Isachsen married Signe Amalie Eide (1876–1911) in 1903. Signehamna harbour in Svalbard is named in her honour. They had three children (Fridtjov, Nils, and Gerd). His second marriage, in 1916, was to Marie Sophie Louisa Steenstrup (1884–1958). They had five children (Kjell, Inger, Karen, Odd, and Finn); Odd Isachsen is still living. Through his second marriage, Gunnar Isachsen was a brother-in-law of Hjalmar Steenstrup.

In 1903, he was knighted 1st Class of the Order of St. Olav, and was commander of the Cross 2nd Class in 1931. He held the King's Medal of Merit in gold (1912), as well as a number of foreign orders and medals.

From 1911, he lived on his farm Vardeborg, under the Vardåsen, the highest point in Asker, Norway. Isachsen died of a heart attack in Asker in 1939.

== Honors ==
- Isachsen, Nunavut, Canada, a now abandoned remote Arctic research station on the western shore of Ellef Ringnes Island in the Sverdrup Islands, was named in his honour in April 1948.
- He was depicted on a Norwegian postage stamp in 2006 on the occasion of the 100th anniversary of the exploration of Svalbard.
- Isachsen Mountain, south-east of Mount Bergersen in the Sør Rondane Mountains, is named for Maj. Gunnar Isachsen, who was the leader with Captain Hjalmar Riiser-Larsen of the Norwegian expedition to this area in 1930–31.
- The plateau glacier Isachsenfonna on Spitsbergen, Svalbard, a glacier he traversed in 1906, is named after him.
- 1931, Charles P. Daly Medal

== Partial works ==
- Isachsen, G. (1907). Astronomical and geodetical observations. Report of the second Norwegian Arctic expedition in the 'Fram', no. 5 = vol. 2. Kristiania: A.W. Brøgger.
- Isachsen, G. (1913). Exploration du Nord-Ouest du Spitsberg entreprise sous les ausp. de S.A.C. le Prince de Monaco par la mission Isachsen 2 Description du champ dóperation. Monaco: Impr. de Monaco.
