= Liefdefjorden =

Fjord in Svalbard, Norway

Coordinates: 79°36′02″N 12°52′07″E

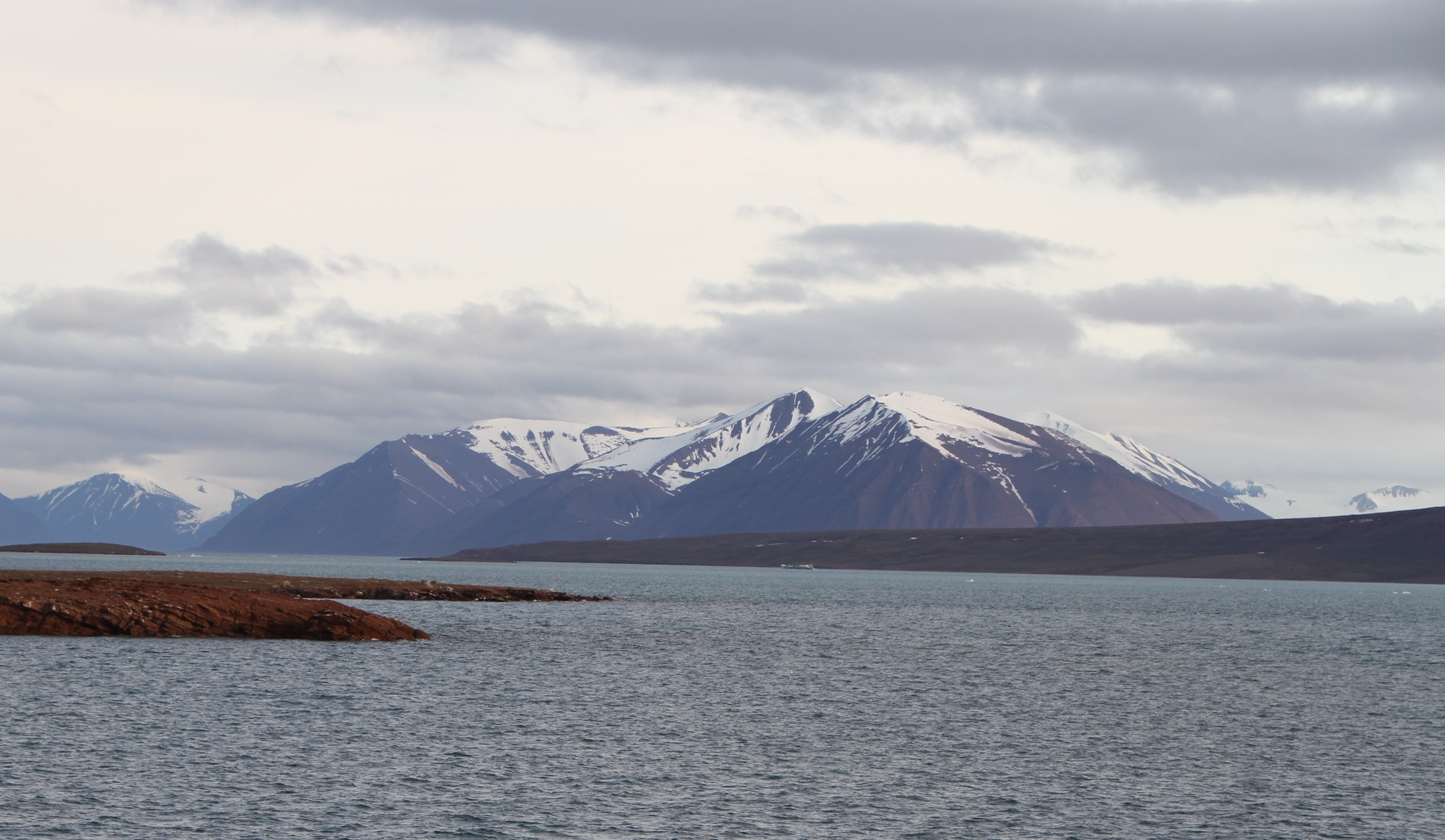
View from Liefdefjorden, towards the south/west with An¨øyholmane isles. Haakon VII Land, Northern Spitsbergen (Norway).

Liefdefjorden (English: The Love Fjord) is a fjord in Haakon VII Land on Spitsbergen, Svalbard. It has a length of about 30 km (19 mi). Former names of the fjord include Baye d'Amour, Kjærlighedsbugten, Porto detto l'Amato, Liefde Bay and Love Bay. Monacobreen debouches into the fjord.

At the northern side of the outer part of the fjord is the peninsula Reinsdyrflya. Liefde is Dutch for "love" and the fjord is possible named after a ship "de Liefde".

The mountains surrounding the fjord contain deposits from Silurian and Devonian ages.
