= Ole Hansenkammen =

Mountain ridge in Svalbard, Norway

Coordinates: 79.148°N 11.990°E

Ole Hansenkammen is a mountain ridge in Haakon VII Land at Spitsbergen, Svalbard. The ridge extends over a length of about 5.5 kilometers, and has peaks of heights 819 and 686 m.a.s.l. It belongs to the mountain group of Generalfjella, along with Tverrkammen and Austflanken. The mountain is named after Norwegian army general Ole Hansen.
