= Bredichinryggen =

Mountain ridge in Spitsbergen, Norway

Coordinates: 76.9228°N 16.4769°E

Bredichinryggen is a mountain ridge in Sørkapp Land at Spitsbergen, Svalbard, Norway. It is named after Russian astronomer Fyodor Bredikhin. The ridge has a length of about fourteen kilometers, and is located south of Hornsund, east of the glaciers of Vestjøkulen and Chomjakovbreen, and west of Austjøkulen and Mendeleevbreen. The ridge comprises the mountains Knattberget, Austjøkultinden, Hjelmen, Steinhatten, Stuptinden, Černajafjellet, Bladegga, Smalegga, Starostinfjellet and Bautaen.
