= Blomstrandhamna Bird Sanctuary =

Norwegian bird reserve

Coordinates: 79°00′00″N 12°04′48″E

Blomstrandhamna Bird Sanctuary (Norwegian: Blomstrandhamna fuglereservat) is a bird reserve at Svalbard, Norway, established in 1973. It includes the skerry in Blomstrandhamna in Haakon VII Land. The protected area covers a total of 580,000 square metres.
