= Hedgehogfjellet =

Mountain in Svalbard, Norway

Coordinates: 76.965°N 17.250°E

Hedgehogfjellet is a mountain in Sørkapp Land at Spitsbergen, Svalbard. It has a height of 615 m.a.s.l. The mountain is situated south of Tvillingtoppen, between the sea and the glacier of Hedgehogfonna.

The lagoon of Davislaguna is located at the foot of Hedgehogfjellet and Tvillingtoppen.
