= Svanhildpasset =

Mountain pass in Svalbard, Norway

Coordinates: 76.915°N 16.824°E

Svanhildpasset is a glaciated mountain pass in Sørkapp Land at Spitsbergen, Svalbard. It is named after Svanhild Eugenie Lund. The pass is situated between the mountains of Pulkovofjella and Brendetoppane. It separates the glaciers of Vasil'evbreen and Svalisbreen.
