= Monacobreen =

Glacier in Svalbard, Norway

Coordinates: 79°23′54″N 12°36′24″E

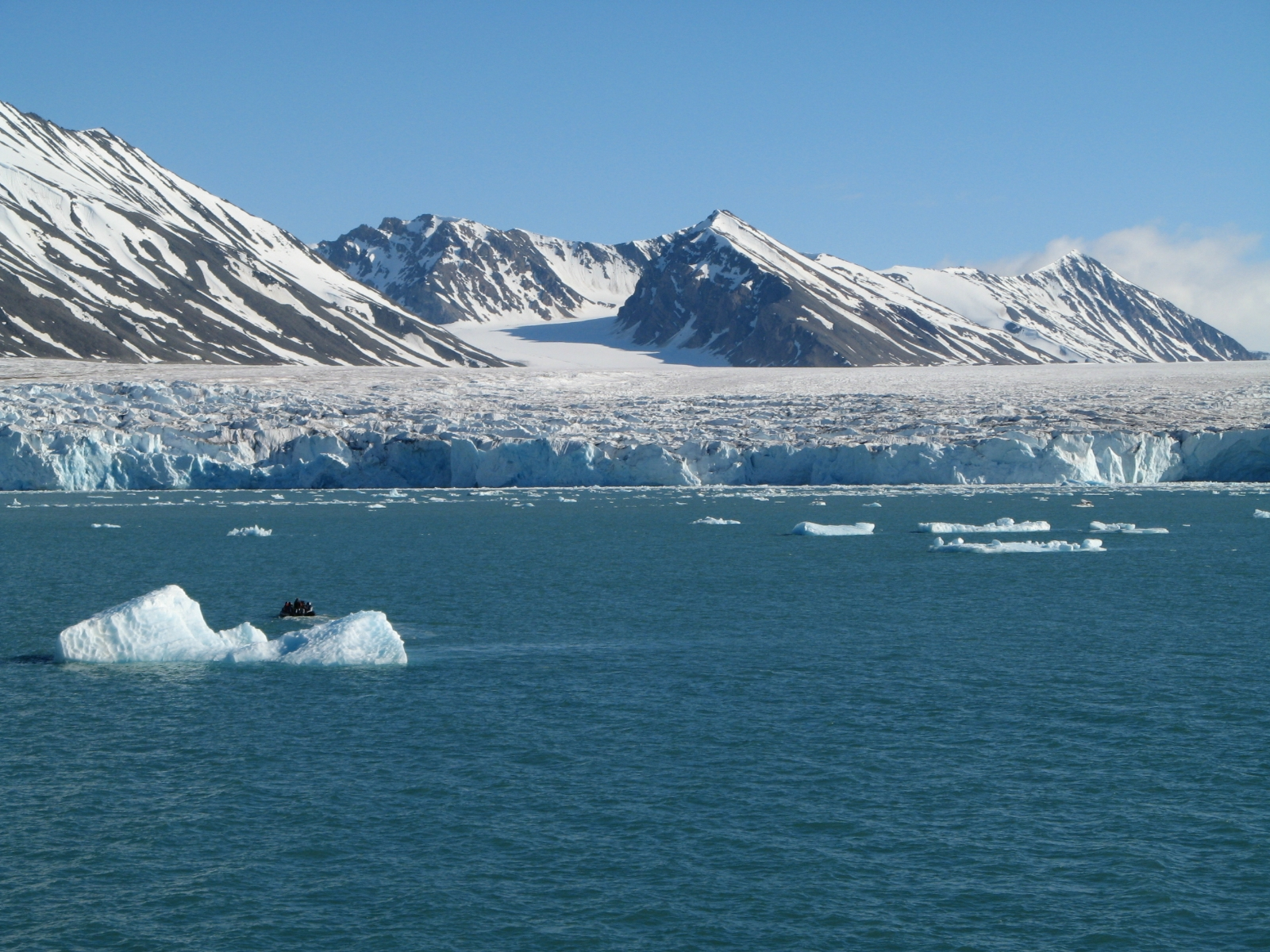
Monacobreen as seen from Liefdefjord

Monacobreen is a glacier in Haakon VII Land on Spitsbergen, Svalbard. The glacier debouches into Liefdefjorden. Former names of the glacier include Glacier de Monaco and Liefde Bay-bræ.
