= Dyrevika =

Bay in Svalbard, Norway

Coordinates: 78.9950°N 12.2542°E

Dyrevika is a bay in Haakon VII Land at Spitsbergen, Svalbard. It is located at the inner part and northern side of Kongsfjorden, and extends from the eastern side of Blomstrandhalvøya to Gerdøya and further southeast to moraines deposited by Kongsbreen.
