= Chydeniusbreen =

Glacier in Svalbard, Norway

Chydeniusbreen (79°13′15″N 18°09′15″E) is a glacier in Ny-Friesland at Spitsbergen, Svalbard. It is named after Finnish physicist Jakob Karl Emil Chydenius. The glacier has a length of about twentyfive kilometers, and flows from the mountain group of Chydeniusfjella towards the bay of Vaigattbogen.
