= Skilfonna =

Glacier in Svalbard, Norway

Coordinates: 76.932°N 16.911°E

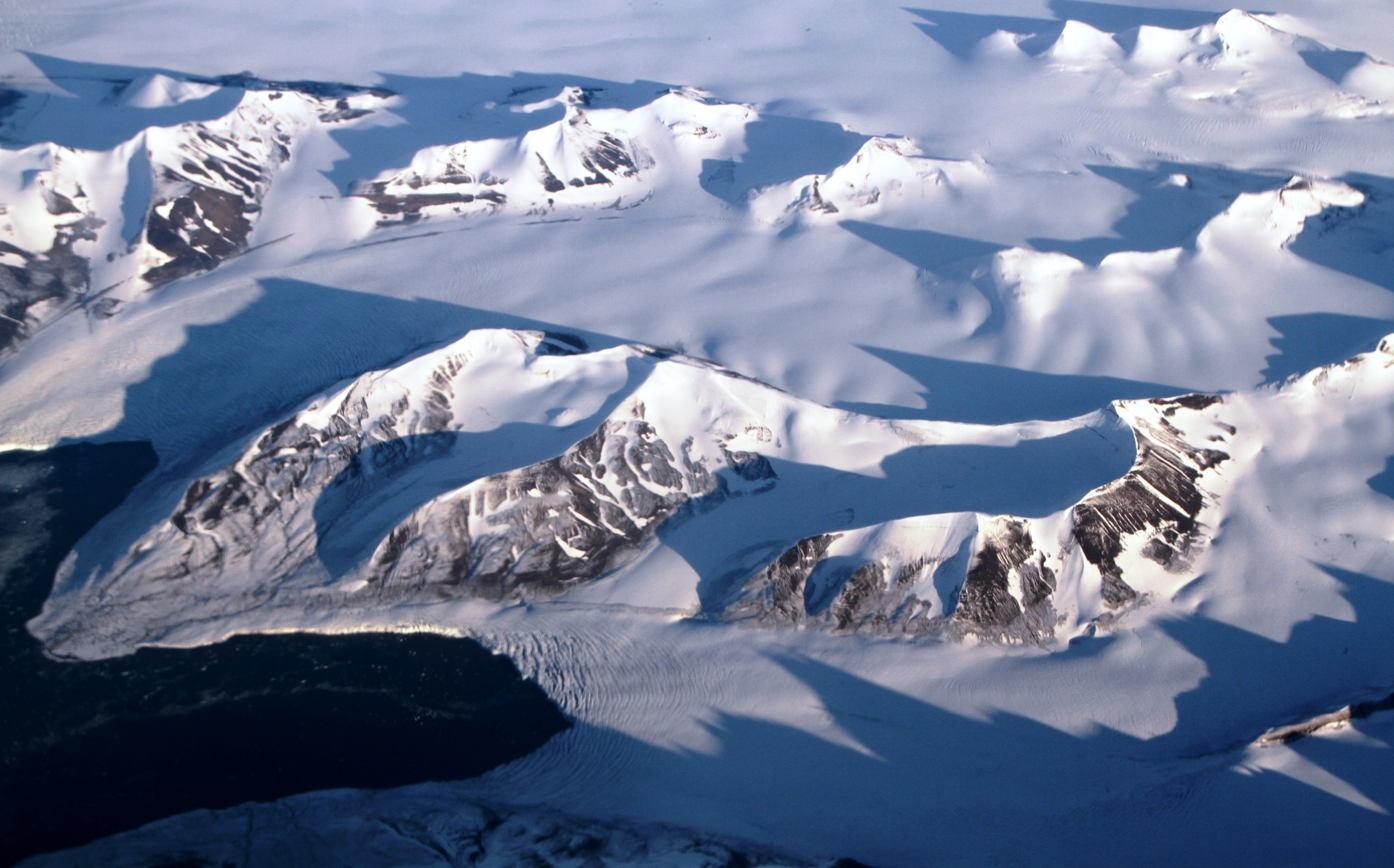
Slopes on Skilfonna

Skilfonna ("The Divide Glacier") is a glacier in Sørkapp Land at Spitsbergen, Svalbard. It is located west of Russefjella, and separates the glacier of Hedgehogfonna from Vasil'evbreen. The mountains of Brendetoppane separate Skilfonna from Svalisbreen.
