= Mefonna =

Glacier in Svalbard, Norway

Coordinates: 76.8171°N 16.4492°E

Mefonna is a glacier in Sørkapp Land at Spitsbergen, Svalbard. It has a length of about seven kilometers. The glacier drains both northwards and southwards. In the northern direction, Samarinbreen debouches into Samarinvågen. To the south, Olsokbreen debouches into Stormbukta.
