= Brepollen =

Bay in Svalbard, Norway

Coordinates: 76.9903°N 16.3195°E

Brepollen ("The Glacier Bay") is a bay in Sørkapp Land and Torell Land at Spitsbergen, Svalbard. It is located at the inner part of Hornsund, surrounded by the glaciers Mendeleevbreen, Svalisbreen, Hornbreen and Storbreen.
