= Traunkammen =

Mountain in Svalbard, Norway

Coordinates: 76.9598°N 16.1748°E

Traunkammen is a mountain in Sørkapp Land at Spitsbergen, Svalbard. It forms a ridge of about three kilometers and is located south of Hornsund, west of the bay Samarinvågen, and east of Petersbreen. Its highest peak is 692 m.a.s.l. The ridge is named after Austrian count Otto Traun.
