= Jebensfjellet =

Mountain in Svalbard

Coordinates: 78°21′10″N 18°28′10″E

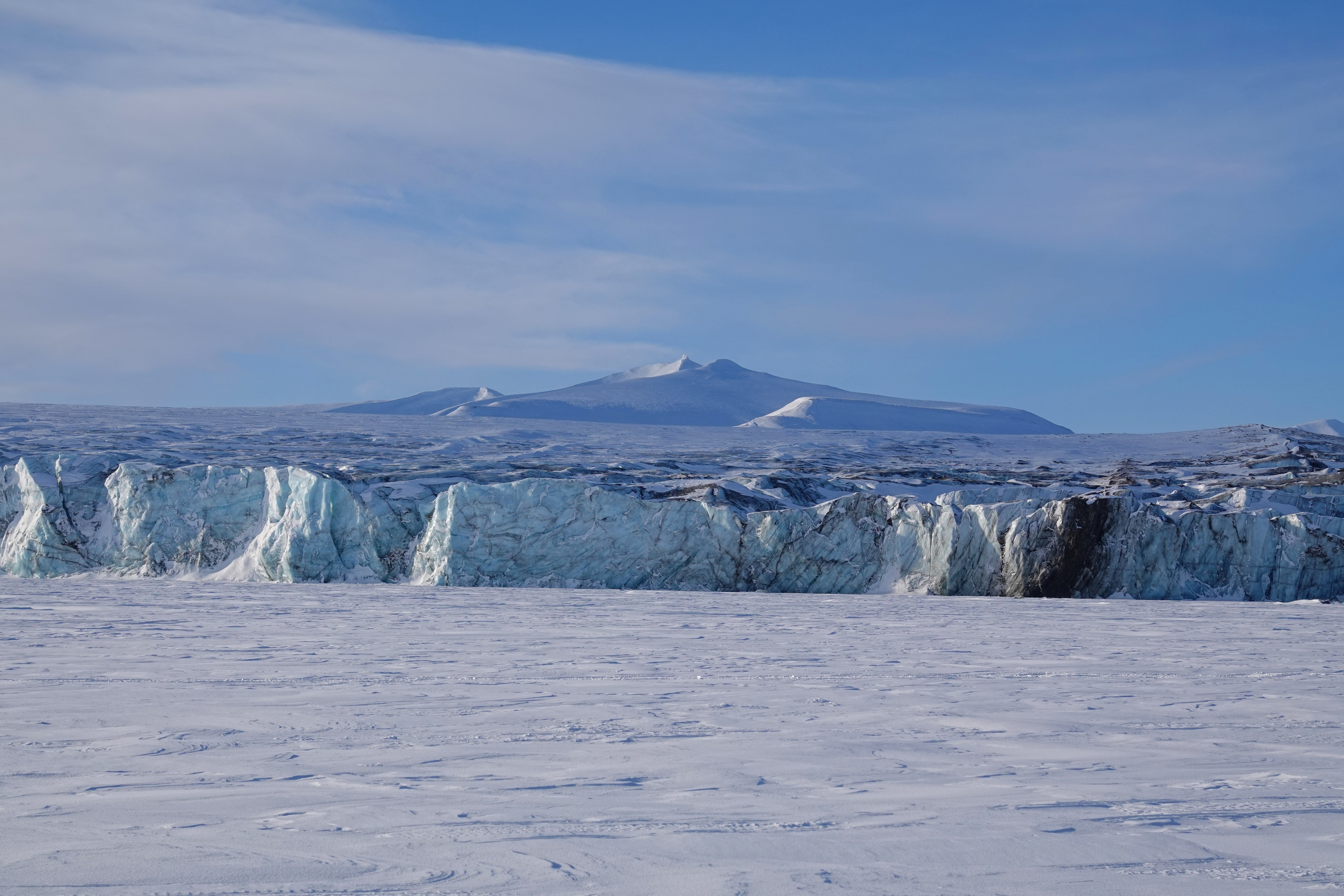
Jebensfjellet seen from Mohnbukta and the east

Jebensfjellet is a mountain in Sabine Land at Spitsbergen, Svalbard. The mountain has a height of 607 m.a.s.l., and is surrounded by the glaciers of Hayesbreen, Luitpoldbreen and Königsbergbreen. It is named after businessperson Johann Heinrich Theodor Jebens.
