= Mohnbukta =

Bight in Svalbard, Norway

Coordinates: 78.32°N 18.86°E

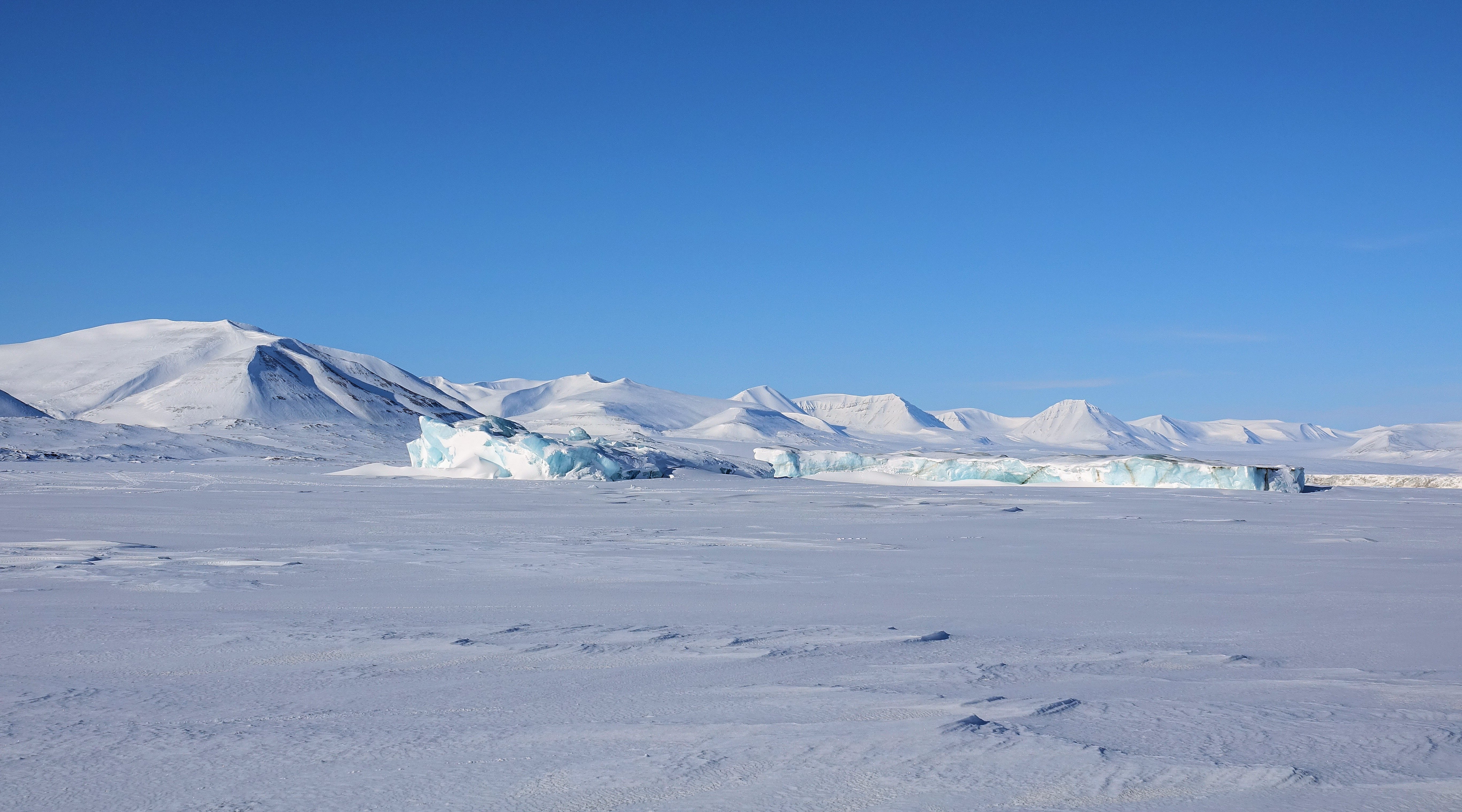
The west shore of Mohnbukta, Svalbard seen from out on the bay covered in ice.

Mohnbukta is a bay at the western shore of Storfjorden in Sabine Land at Spitsbergen, Svalbard. It is named after Norwegian meteorologist Henrik Mohn. The glacier of Hayesbreen is situated northwest of the bay. At the western side of the bay is the mountain of Kroghfjellet, and north of the bay is the mountain of Teistberget.
