= Liestølbreen =

Glacier in Svalbard, Norway

Coordinates: 77.43°N 16.68°E

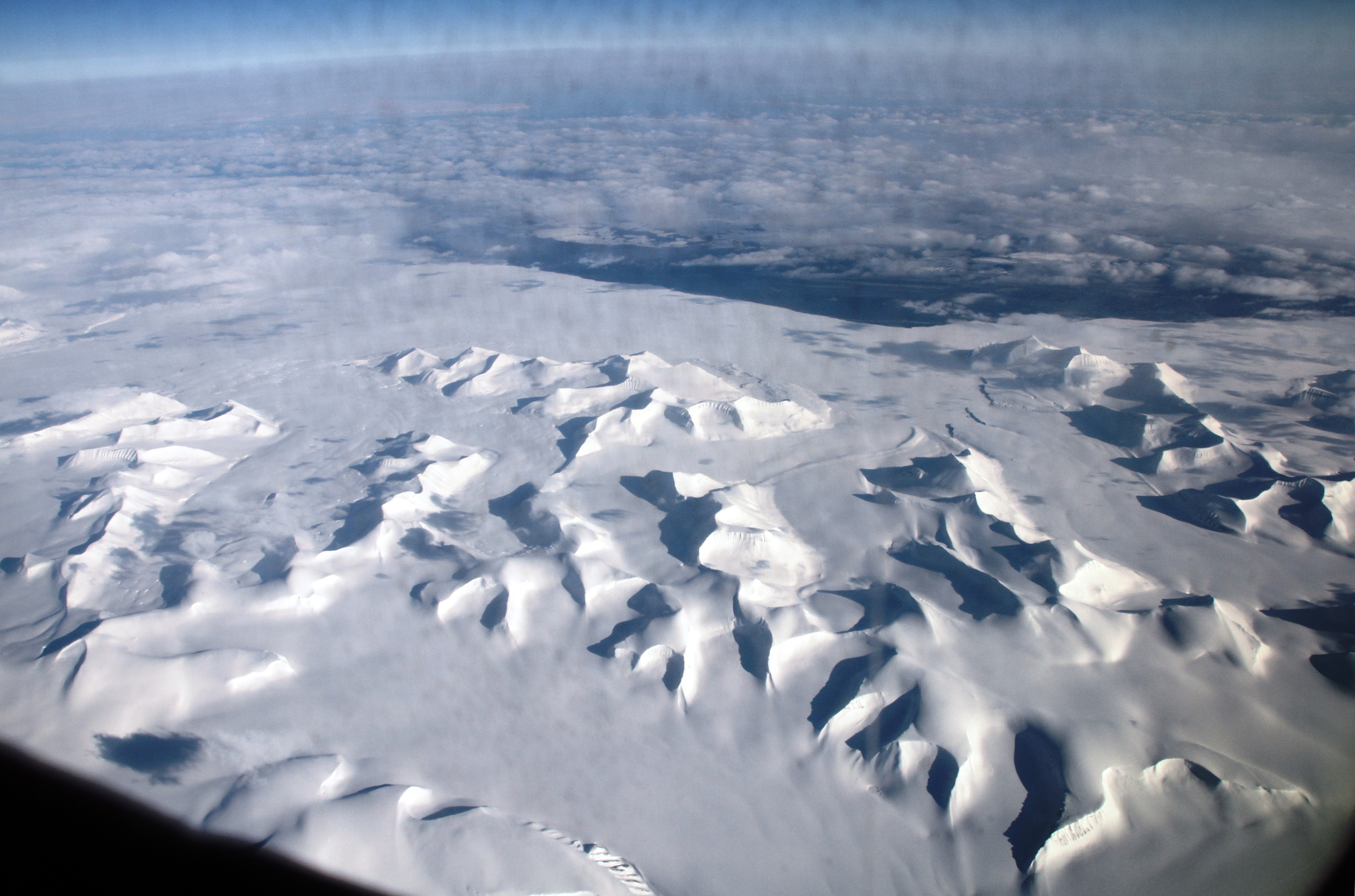
Liestølbreen

Liestølbreen is a glacier complex in Torell Land at Spitsbergen, Svalbard. It is named after Norwegian glaciologist Olav Liestøl. The glacier is situated between the mountains of Arrheniusfjellet and Wijkberget. The glaciers of Krøkjebreen and Glasiologbreen belong to the Liestølbreen complex.
