= Blomstrandbreen =

Glacier in Svalbard

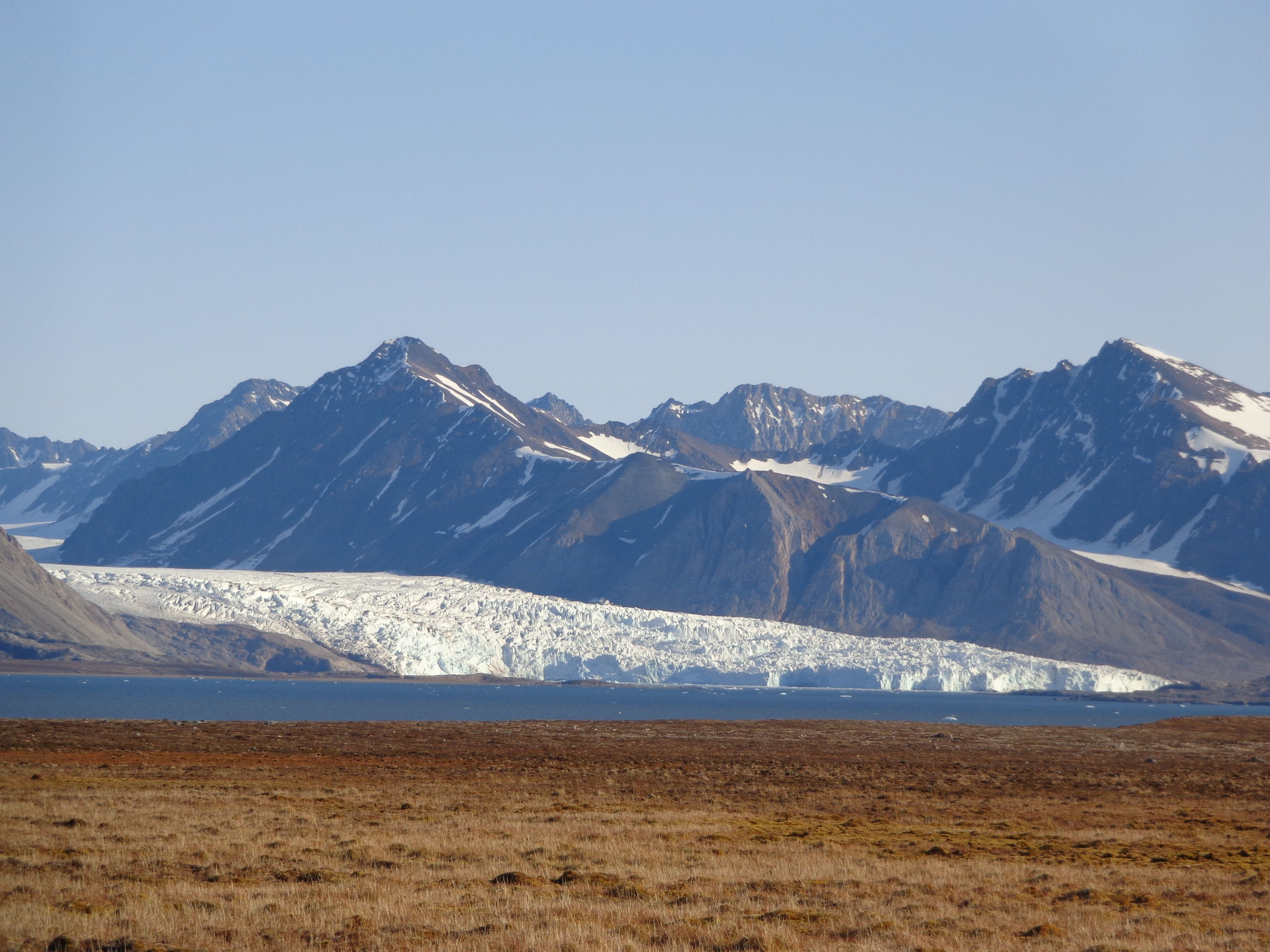

- Location within Svalbard
- Type: Glacier
- Location: Haakon VII Land; Spitsbergen, Svalbard
- Coordinates: 79.0662°N 12.3815°E
- Length: 18 kilometres

Blomstrandbreen is a glacier in Haakon VII Land at the western side of Spitsbergen, Svalbard. It has a length of 18 kilometres, extending from Isachsenfonna down to Kongsfjorden. The glacier is named after geologist Christian Wilhelm Blomstrand. To the northwest of the glacier is the mountain area of Mercantonfjellet. Analyses published in 2018 show that the Blomstrandbreen glacier has retreated over 2 kilometers since 1928 and more than 3 kilometers since 1861. Further retreat is likely in the coming decades. This glacier has become widely known due to photographers Christian Åslund and Neill Drake.
