= Tvillingtoppen =

Mountain in Svalbard, Norway

Coordinates: 76°58′39″N 17°14′56″E

Tvillingtoppen ("Twin Peak") is a mountain peak in Sørkapp Land at Spitsbergen, Svalbard. It has a height of 532 m.a.s.l. The mountain is situated north of the mountain of Hedgehogfjellet, and south of the glacier of Coryellbreen.

The lagoon of Davislaguna is located at the foot of Tvillingtoppen and Hedgehogfjellet.
