= Vonbreen =

Glacier in Haakon VII Land and Andrée Land at Spitsbergen, Svalbard

Coordinates: 79.1591°N 13.7600°E

Vonbreen (Hope Glacier) is a glacier in Haakon VII Land and Andrée Land at Spitsbergen, Svalbard. It has an extension of about 25 kilometers, and is located south of Woodfjorden. The name is a translation of the German language Hoffnungs-Gletscher, suggested by Bock and Poninski in 1908. The glacier borders to Eidsvollfjellet, the highest mountain in Haakon VII Land.
