= Stellingfjellet =

Mountain in Svalbard, Norway

Coordinates: 77.1036°N 17.3131°E

Stellingfjellet is a mountain in Torell Land at Spitsbergen, Svalbard. The mountain is listed as one of the largest bird cliffs in the Svalbard archipelago. It is located south of the glacier Markhambreen. The mountain is named after Russian scientist Eduard Vasiljevich Stelling.
