= Krøkjebreen =

Glacier in Svalbard

Coordinates: 77.386°N 16.907°E

Krøkjebreen ("The Bent Glacier") is a glacier in Torell Land at Spitsbergen, Svalbard. It has a length of nine kilometers. Krøkjebreen is part of the Liestølbreen glacier complex, situated between the mountains of Arrheniusfjellet and Wijkberget.
