= Davislaguna =

Lagoon in Svalbard, Norway

Coordinates: 76°58′22″N 17°16′59″E

Davislaguna is a lagoon in Sørkapp Land at Spitsbergen, Svalbard. It has a length of about 900 meters (2,953 ft), and is located at the foot of the mountains of Hedgehogfjellet and Tvillingtoppen. The name "Davislaguna" is derived from the name "Lady Davis Harbour", given to the lagoon by members of an expedition from 1919. In 1937 the alternative name Dorrieshamna was also suggested.
