= Signehamna =

Bay in Svalbard, Norway

Coordinates: 79.2723°N 11.5343°E

Signehamna is a bay and natural harbour in Albert I Land at Spitsbergen, Svalbard. It is located at the western side of Lilliehöökfjorden. The bay has a width and length of about one nautical mile. The headland Gunnarpynten in the middle of the bay, which separates Signehamna from Nilspollen, created a suitable harbour for smaller vessels.

Signehamna is included in the Nordvest-Spitsbergen National Park. Relics from weather station Knospe (1941-1942), then Nussbaum, built by German occupants during World War II, are located on the shore.
