= Russefjella =

Mountain ridge in Spitsbergen, Svalbard

Coordinates: 76.918°N 16.970°E

Russefjella is a mountain ridge in Sørkapp Land at Spitsbergen, Svalbard. It has a length of about five kilometers, and is located east of Skilfonna. The highest peak on the ridge is 580 m.a.s.l.
