= Lilliehöökbreen =

Glacier complex in Svalbard, Norway

Coordinates: 79.3973°N 11.7292°E

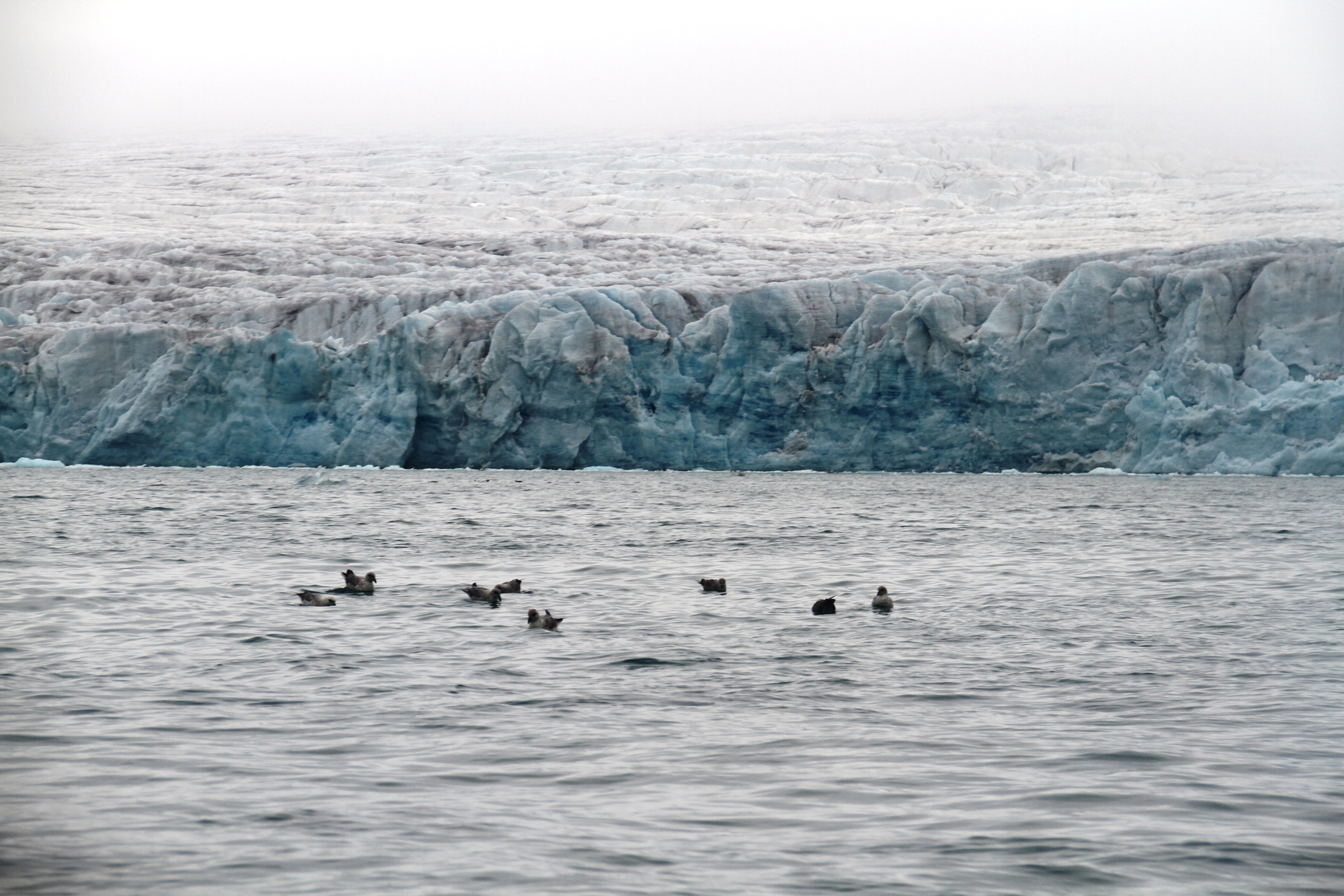
Lilliehöökbreen

Lilliehöökbreen is a glacier complex in Albert I Land and Haakon VII Land at Spitsbergen, Svalbard. It has a length of about 22 kilometers. The glacier debouches into Lilliehöökfjorden, and calved icebergs may fill large parts of the fourteen kilometer long fjord.

The glacier is named after Swedish commander Gustaf Bertil Lilliehöök.

== See also ==
- List of glaciers in Svalbard
