= Markhambreen =

Glacier at Spitsbergen, Norway

Coordinates: 77.1225°N 17.2029°E

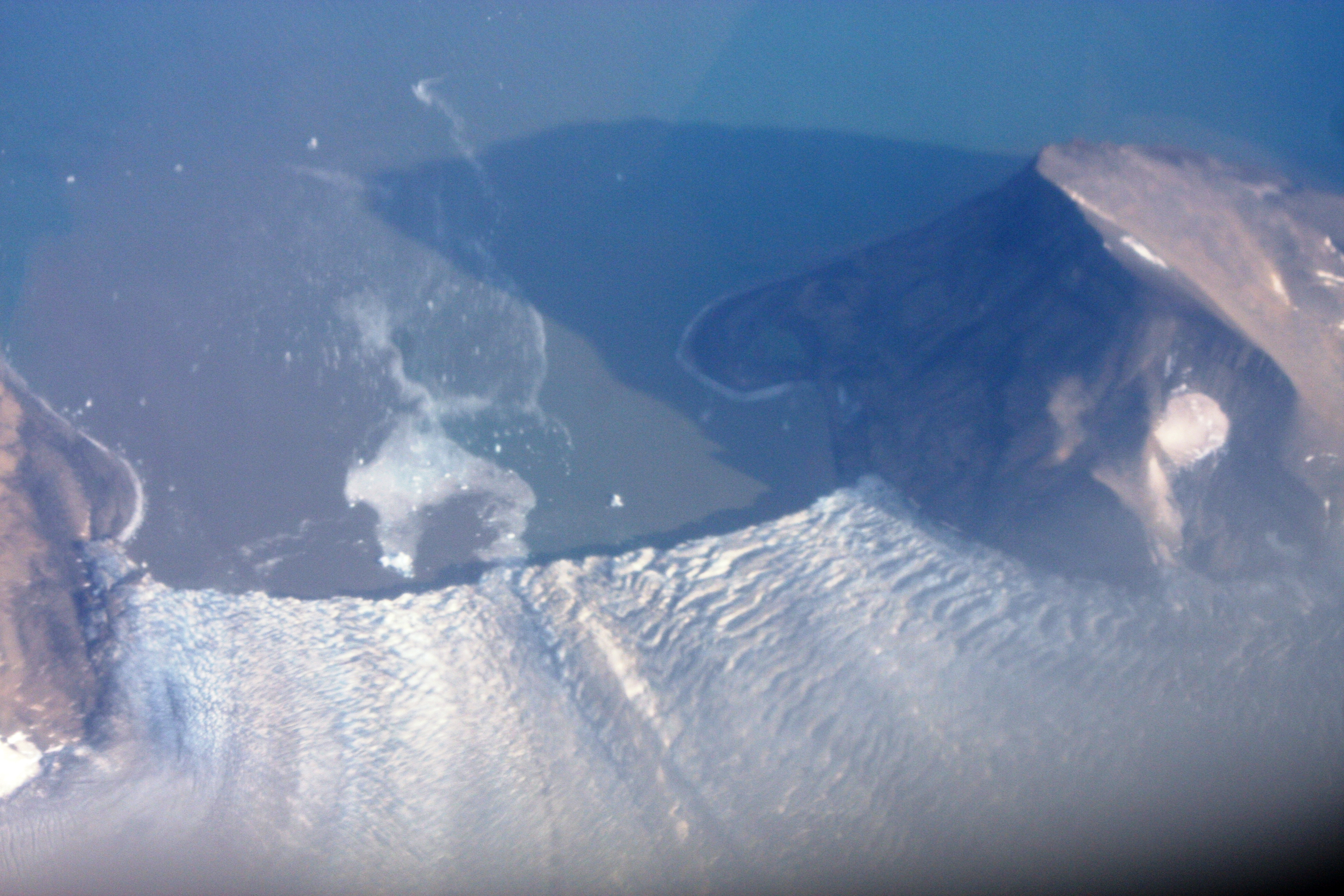
Markhambreen and Skrenthøgda

Markhambreen is a glacier in Torell Land at Spitsbergen, Svalbard. It is named after English geographer Clements Robert Markham.

The glacier is located at the western side of Storfjorden, north of the mountain Stellingfjellet.
