= Hedgehogfonna =

Glacier in Svalbard, Norway

Coordinates: 76.96°N 17.00°E

Hedgehogfonna is a glacier field in Sørkapp Land at Spitsbergen, Svalbard. It is located west of the mountain of Hedgehogfjellet, and is separated from the glacier of Vasil'evbreen by Skilfonna.

The glacier of Sykorabreen extends seven kilometers northwards from Hedgehogfonna, and the glacier of Tromsøbreen extends six kilometers southwards.
