= Storbreen =

Glacier in Svalbard, Norway

Coordinates: 77.13°N 16.34°E

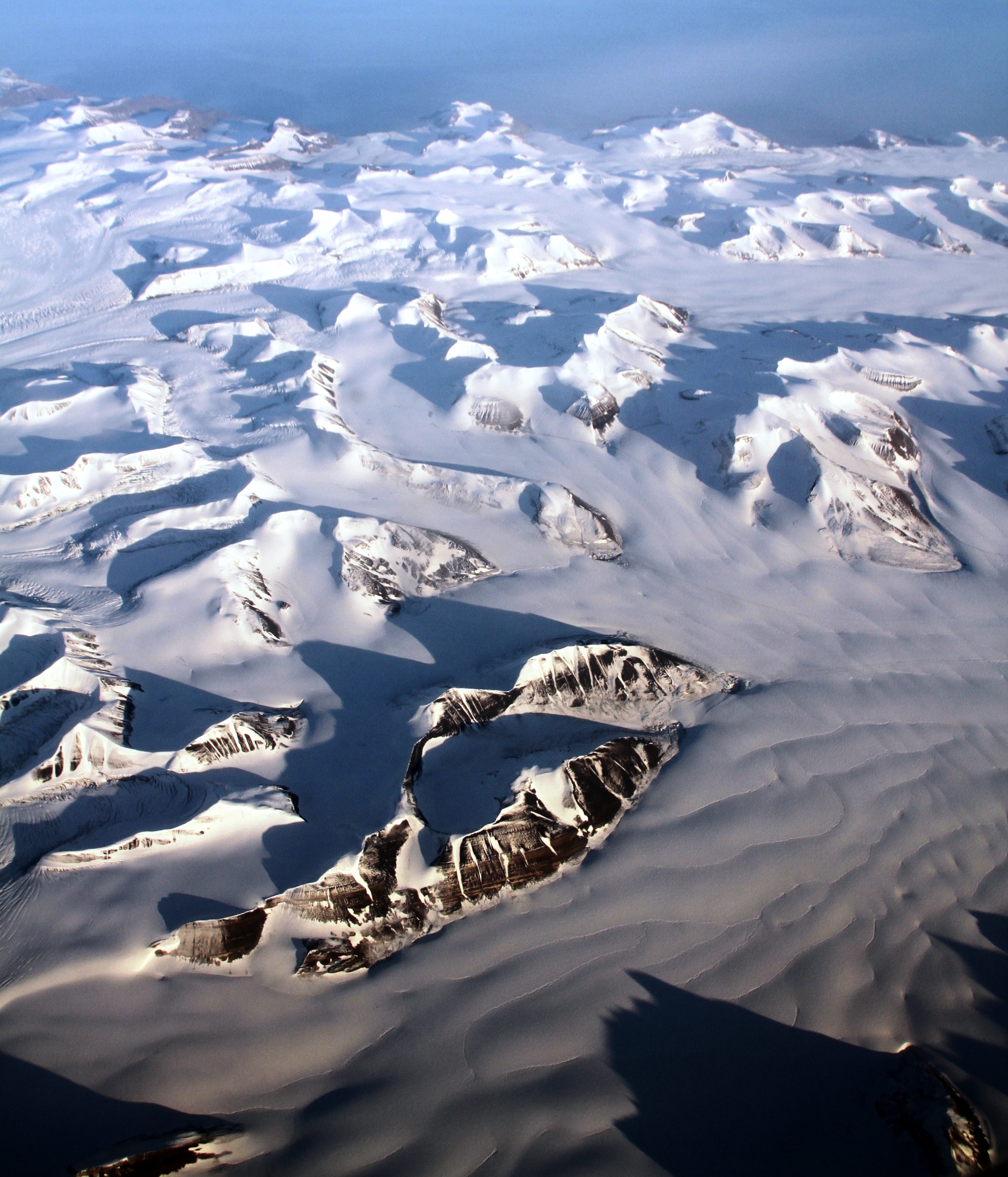
Storbreen, Isskiltoppane, Bendefjellet, Flatbreen

Storbreen ("The Large Glacier") is a glacier in Torell Land at Spitsbergen, Svalbard. It has a length of about fifteen kilometers, and debouches towards the bay of Brepollen, the inner part of Hornsund.
