= Angelbreen =

Glacier at Spitsbergen, Svalbard, Norway

Coordinates: 79.0708°N 15.3656°E

Angelbreen (Fish Hook Glacier) is a glacier in Andrée Land at Spitsbergen, Svalbard. It is located between Skuggefjellet and Skirshorg, at the western side of Vestfjorddalen. The shape of the glacier resembles a fish hook.
