= Fredfonna =

Glacier in Svalbard, Norway

Coordinates: 76.9119°N 16.6450°E

Fredfonna ("The Peaceful Glacier") is a glacier in Sørkapp Land at Spitsbergen, Svalbard. It has a length of about 4.5 kilometers. The glacier drains to the north into Mendeleevbreen, and to the south into Øydebreen. It is located east of the mountain ridge of Isryggen, and southwest of the mountain Scott-Ruudfjellet.
