= Dahlbreen =

Glacier in Svalbard

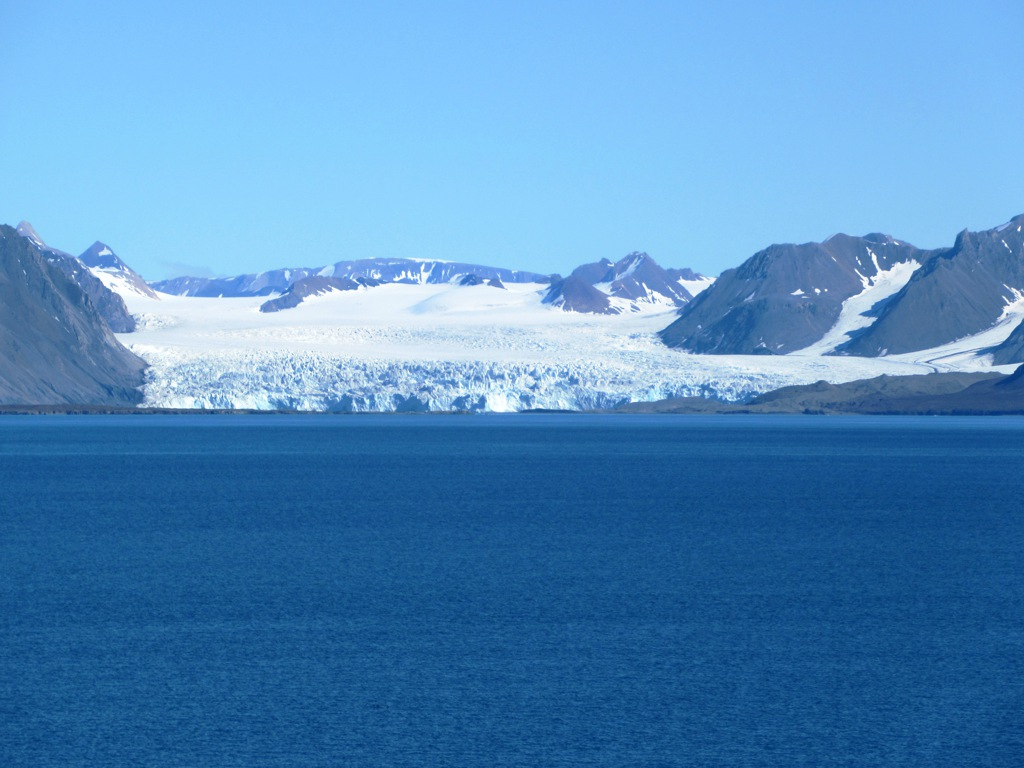

- Location within Svalbard
- Type: Glacier
- Location: Oscar II Land; Spitsbergen, Svalbard
- Coordinates: 78.62°N 12.60°E
- Length: c.15 km

Dahlbreen is a glacier in Oscar II Land at Spitsbergen, Svalbard. It is named after whaler Thor Dahl. The glacier has a length of about fifteen kilometers, extending from Løvenskioldfonna to Forlandsundet. Among its tributary glaciers are Ujamnbreen, Bærumbreen and Fjelgbreen. Retreatment of the glacier has formed the bay of Dahlbrebukta.
