= Hinlopenbreen =

Glacier in Svalbard, Norway

Coordinates: 78°56.8′N 19°03.9′E

Hinlopenbreen ("Hinlopen glacier") is a glacier stream in Spitsbergen, Svalbard. The glacier debouches into Vaigattbogen in Hinlopen Strait. The glacier has a length of about 70 km, and drains an area of about 1,250 km^{2} (480 sq mi).
