= Vaigattbogen =

Bay in Svalbard, Norway

Coordinates: 79.2307°N 19.0796°E

Vaigattbogen is a bay at the eastern side of Spitsbergen, Svalbard, Norway, located between Ny-Friesland and Olav V Land, and opening into Hinlopen Strait. The glacier Hinlopenbreen debouches into Vaigattbogen.
