= Sykorabreen =

Glacier in Svalbard

Coordinates: 77.01°N 17.00°E

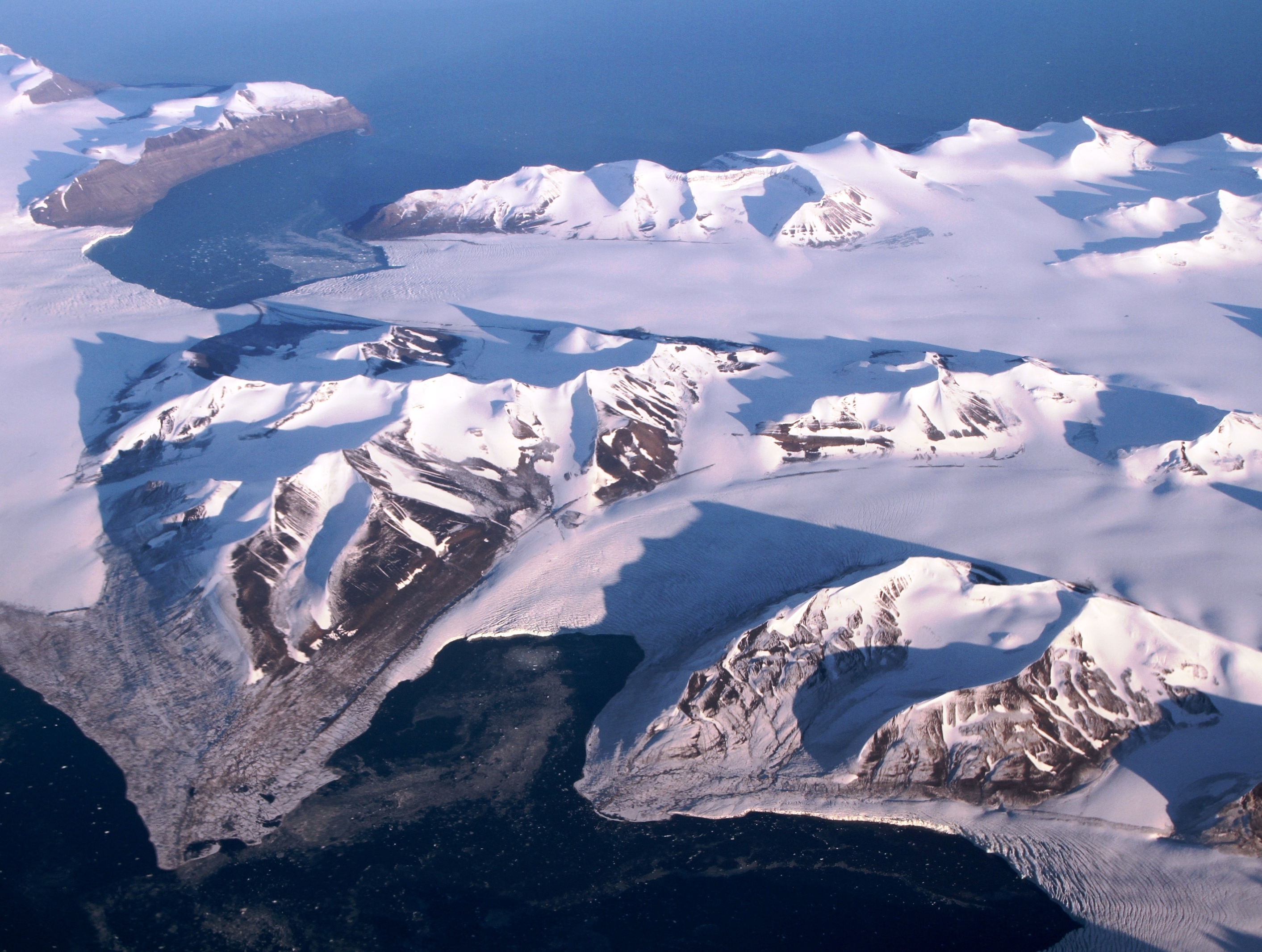

Sykorabreen is a glacier in Sørkapp Land at Spitsbergen, Svalbard. It has a length of about seven kilometers, and extends northwards from Hedgehogfonna to Hambergbreen. The glacier is named after Russian scientist J. Sykora, who participated with the Swedish-Russian Arc-of-Meridian Expedition 1899–1900.
