= Øydebreen =

Glacier in Svalbard, Norway

Coordinates: 76.8836°N 16.7442°E

Øydebreen (The Desolate Glacier) is a glacier in Sørkapp Land at Spitsbergen, Svalbard. It has a length of about 4.5 kilometers, southwards from Fredfonna, between the mountains of Gedenovfjellet and Øydenuten. It connects southwards to the large Vasil'evbreen.
