= Usherbreen =

Glacier in Svalbard, Norway

Coordinates: 78.2600°N 18.8000°E

Usherbreen is a glacier in Sabine Land at Spitsbergen, Svalbard. It has a length of about 9.5 kilometers, and is located between Kroghfjellet and Domen. Usherbreen is a tributary glacier to Nordmannsfonna, and debouches towards Storfjorden. It is named after Scottish businessman Thomas Leslie Usher.

== See also ==
- Usherfjellet
