= Glasiologbreen =

Glacier in Svalbard, Norway

Coordinates: 77.465°N 16.894°E

Glasiologbreen ("glaciologist glacier") is a glacier in Torell Land at Spitsbergen, Svalbard. The glacier has a length of five kilometers, and is situated between the mountains of Gerdnuten and Wijkberget. Glasiologbreen is part of the Liestølbreen glacier complex.
