= Petersbreen =

Glacier in Svalbard, Norway

Coordinates: 76.9534°N 16.1466°E

Petersbreen is a glacier in Sørkapp Land at Spitsbergen, Svalbard. It has a length of about three kilometers, and is located at the western side of the ridge Traunkammen. The glacier is named after Austrian geologist Karl Ferdinand Peters.
