= Isachsenfonna =

Glacier in Svalbard

- Location within Svalbard
- Type: Plateau glacier
- Location: Haakon VII Land; Spitsbergen, Svalbard
- Coordinates: 79°10′08″N 12°52′58″E
- Area: 140 km^{2} (54 sq mi)

Isachsenfonna is a plateau glacier in Haakon VII Land at the northwestern part of Spitsbergen, Svalbard. It covers an area of about 140 km^{2}, and reaches a height of about 900 m (3,000 ft) above sea level. The glacier is named after polar scientist Gunnar Isachsen, who traversed the glacier in 1906.

== See also ==
- List of glaciers in Svalbard
