= Tinayrebreen =

Glacier in Haakon VII Land at Spitsbergen, Svalbard

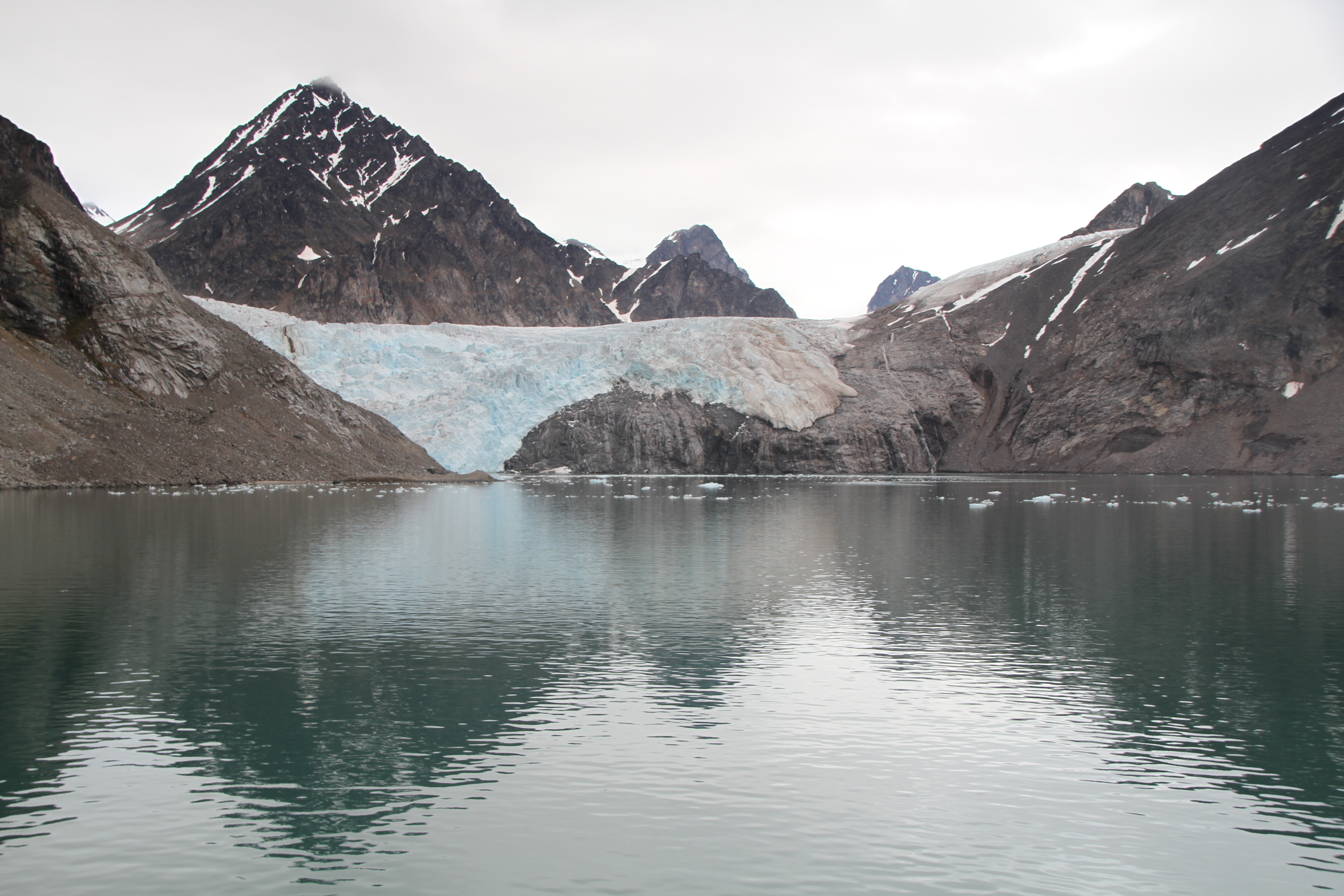

- Location within Svalbard
- Type: Glacier
- Location: Haakon VII Land; Spitsbergen, Svalbard
- Coordinates: 79.2°N 12.4°E
- Length: 10 km (6.2 mi)

Tinayrebreen is a glacier in Haakon VII Land at Spitsbergen, Svalbard. It has a length of about ten kilometers, and extends from the glacier cap of Isachsenfonna to Möllerfjorden, where it debouches into the bay of Tinayrebukta. The glacier is named after French painter Louis Tinayre.

== See also ==
- List of glaciers in Svalbard
