= Tromsøbreen =

Glacier in Svalbard

Coordinates: 76.92°N 17.08°E

Tromsøbreen is a glacier in Sørkapp Land at Spitsbergen, Svalbard. It has a length of about six kilometers, and extends southwards from the ice field of Hedgehogfonna towards the sea. The glacier is named after the Norwegian city of Tromsø.
