= Løvenskioldfonna =

Ice cap in Svalbard, Norway

Coordinates: 78°41′16″N 12°46′19″E

Løvenskioldfonna is an icecap in Oscar II Land at Spitsbergen, Svalbard. The glaciated area is about ten kilometers long and six kilometer wide, and is located north of St. Jonsfjorden, reaching an altitude of above 500 m. It is named after land owner Carl Otto Løvenskiold. The glacier of Dahlbreen extends from Løvenskioldfonna to Forlandsundet.
