= Meranfjellet =

Coordinates: 76.9594°N 16.3201°E

Meranfjellet is a mountain in Sørkapp Land at Spitsbergen, Svalbard. It has a height of 491 m.a.s.l., and is the northern mountain of the ridge Påskefjella. The mountain is named for Franz, Count of Meran.
