= Königsbergbreen =

Glacier in Svalbard, Norway

Coordinates: 78.33°N 18.51°E

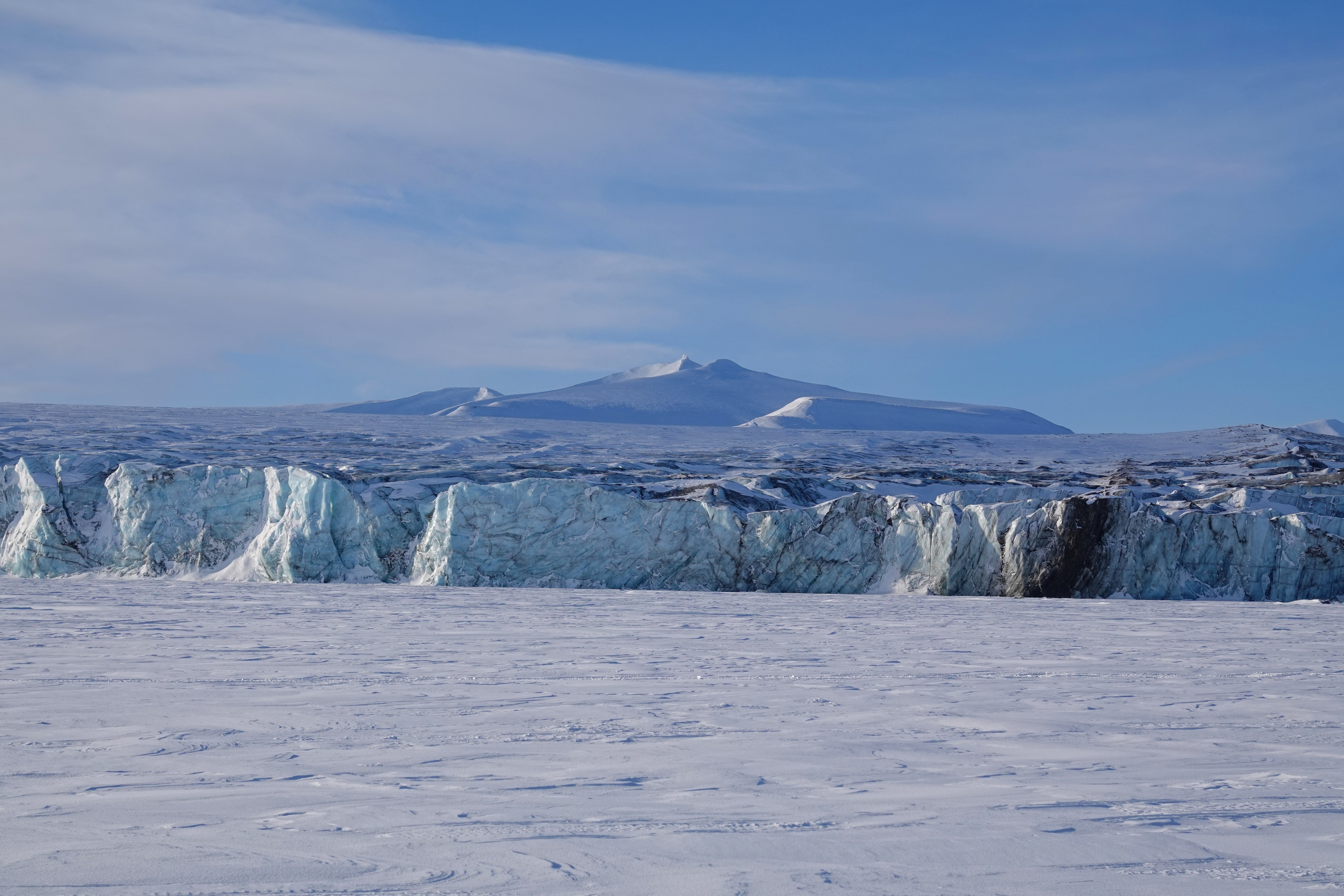
Königsbergbreen can be seen on the left/south side

Königsbergbreen is a glacier in Sabine Land at Spitsbergen, Svalbard. It is named after the German town of Königsberg. The glacier has a length of about seven kilometers, and is a tributary to Hayesbreen. A nearby mountain is Jebensfjellet.
