= Ole Hansen (officer) =

Norwegian army officer

Ole Hansen, GCVO (31 July 1842 – 4 November 1922) was a Norwegian army officer. He was born in Enebakk. He was Commanding General of the Norwegian Army from 1903 to 1910, with the rank of lieutenant general. He was decorated Knight in 1896, Commander in 1904, and with the Grand Cross of the Order of St. Olav in 1910. He received the Grand Cross of the Danish Order of the Dannebrog, and an honorary knighthood of the British Royal Victorian Order.

The mountain of Ole Hansenkammen at Spitsbergen, Svalbard, is named after Hansen.
