= Mendeleevbreen =

Glacier in Svalbard, Norway

Coordinates: 76.94°N 16.57°E

Mendeleevbreen is a glacier in Sørkapp Land at Spitsbergen, Svalbard. It has a length of about eight kilometers, originating from the glaciers Austjøkulen and Fredfonna, and debouching into the bay of Brepollen at the southern side of Hornsund. The glacier is named after Russian chemist Dmitri Mendeleev.
