= Lilliehöökfjorden =

Fjord in Svalbard, Norway

Coordinates: 79°15′43″N 11°41′08″E

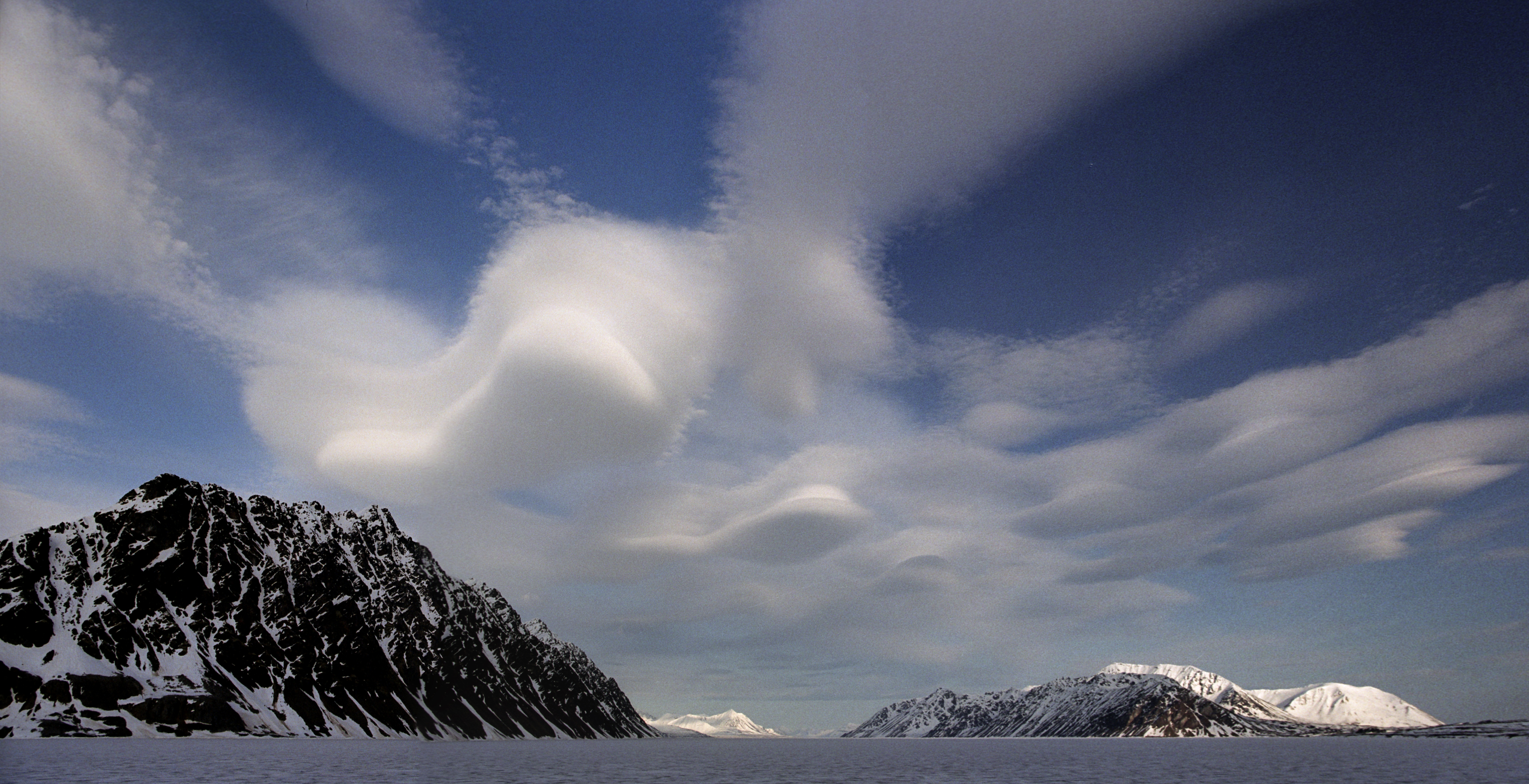
Lilliehöökfjorden

Lilliehöökfjorden is a 14 kilometer long fjord branch of Krossfjorden in Albert I Land at the northwestern side of Spitsbergen, Svalbard. The fjord is named after Gustaf Bertil Lilliehöök.

Lilliehöökfjorden is separated from Möllerfjorden by the 12-kilometre (7.5 mi) mountain ridge Kong Haakons Halvøy.

The Lilliehöökbreen glacier debouches into the fjord, and calved ice may fill large parts of the fjord.
