= Arrheniusfjellet =

Mountain in Spitsbergen, Norway

Coordinates: 77°24′08″N 16°26′14″E

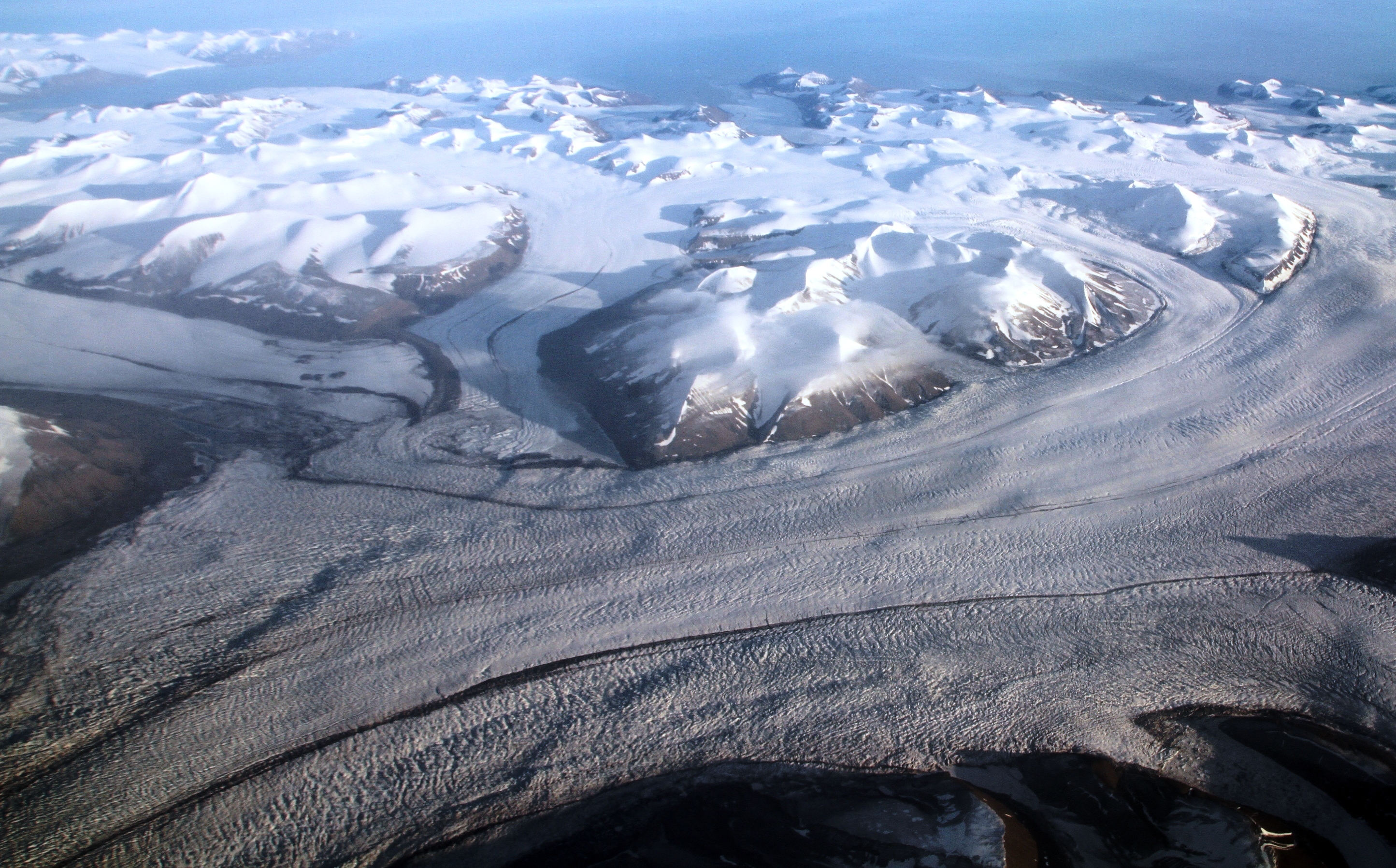
The mountain Arrheniusfjellet with Nathorstbreen glacier sliding past into a fjord

Nahimutangan sa Arrheniusfjellet sa Svalbard and Jan Mayen.

Arrheniusfjellet is a mountain in Torell Land at Spitsbergen, Svalbard. It is named after Swedish physicist Svante Arrhenius. The mountain has a height of 883 m.a.s.l. and is located at the head of Van Keulenfjorden. The glacier of Vindbreen separates Arrheniusfjellet from Vindfjellet at the southern side. The large glacier of Liestølbreen is situated between Arrheniusfjellet and Wijkberget, and Nathorstbreen is located southwest of the mountain.
