= Svalisbreen =

Glacier in Svalbard, Norway

Coordinates: 76.98°N 16.77°E

Svalisbreen ("The Cool Ice Glacier") is a glacier in Sørkapp Land at Spitsbergen, Svalbard. It has a length of about 12.5 kilometers, extending from the mountain pass of Svanhildpasset to Hornbreen, towards the bay of Brepollen, the inner part of Hornsund.
