= Austjøkulen =

Glacier in Svalbard, Norway

Coordinates: 76.8825°N 16.6262°E

Austjøkulen is a glacier in Sørkapp Land at Spitsbergen, Svalbard. It has a length of about seven kilometers. The glacier drains to the north into Mendeleevbreen, and to the south into Vasil'evbreen. It is located east of the mountain ridge of Bredichinryggen, and west of the ridge Isryggen.
