= Hayesbreen =

Glacier in Svalbard, Norway

Coordinates: 78.384°N 18.510°E

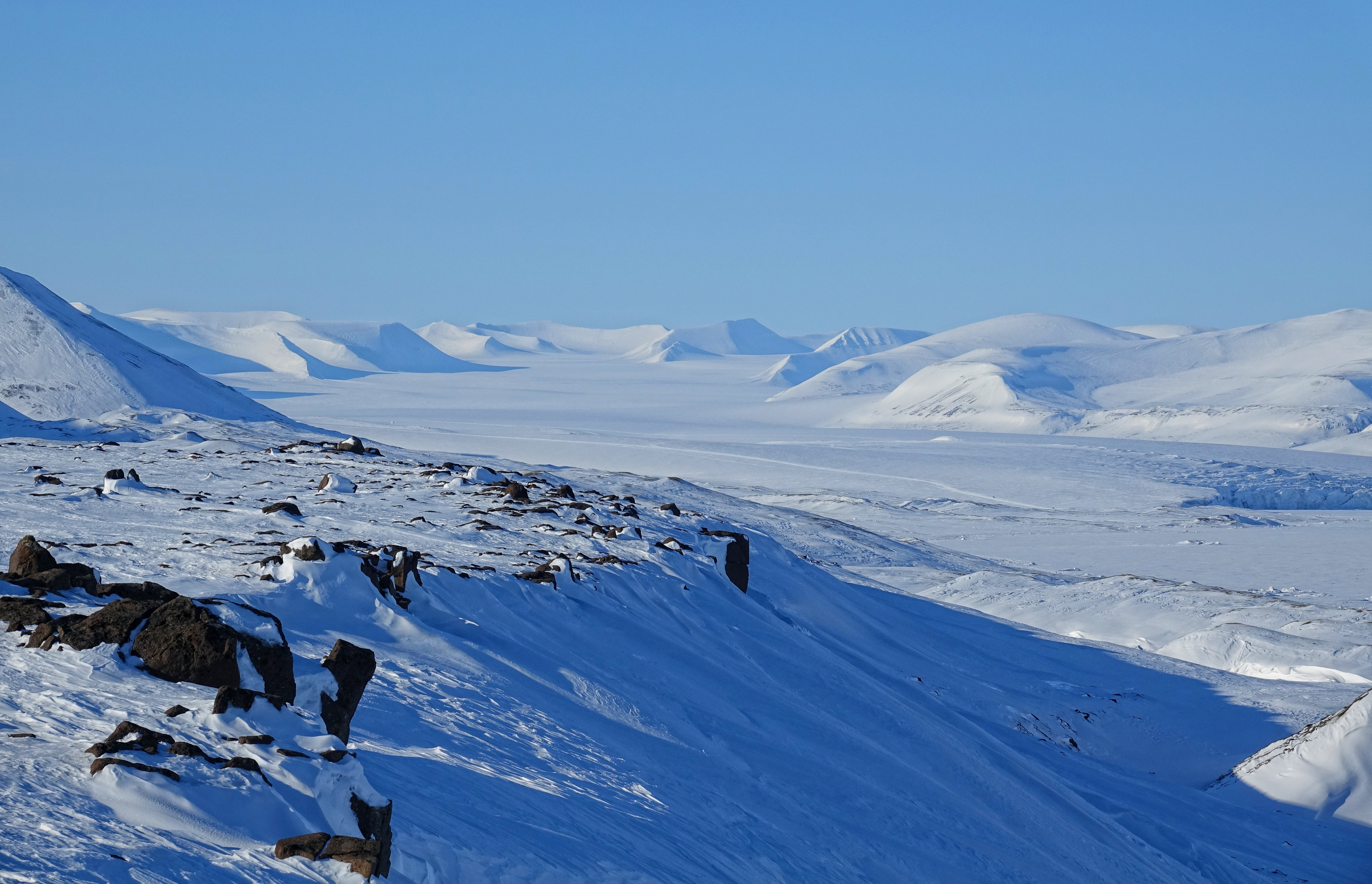
Hayesbreen.jpg

Hayesbreen is a glacier in Sabine Land at Spitsbergen, Svalbard. It is named after American politician and Arctic explorer Isaac Israel Hayes. The glacier has a length of about eighteen kilometers, and debouches into the bay of Mohnbukta. Surrounding mountains are Aagaardfjellet to the north, Jebensfjellet to the south, and Panofskyfjellet where Hayesbreen joins the glacier of Königsbergbreen.
