= Ice cap =

Ice mass that covers a large area

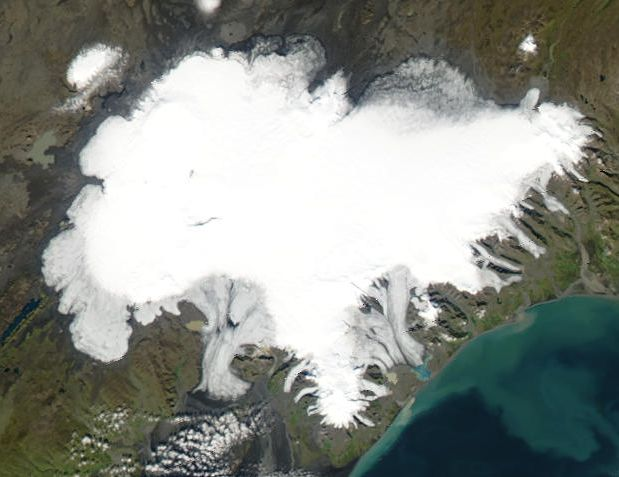
Vatnajökull, Iceland

In glaciology, an ice cap is a mass of ice that covers less than 50,000 km^{2} (19,000 mi^{2}) of land area (usually covering a highland area). Larger ice masses covering more than 50,000 km^{2} (19,000 mi^{2}) are termed ice sheets.

== Description ==
By definition, ice caps are not constrained by topographical features (i.e., they must lie over the top of mountains). By contrast, ice masses of similar size that are constrained by topographical features are known as ice fields. The dome of an ice cap is usually centred on the highest point of a massif. Ice flows away from this high point (the ice divide) towards the ice cap's periphery.

Ice caps significantly affect the geomorphology of the area they occupy. Plastic moulding, gouging and other glacial erosional features become present upon the glacier's retreat. Many lakes, such as the Great Lakes in North America, as well as numerous valleys have been formed by glacial action over hundreds of thousands of years.

The Antarctic and Greenland contain 99% of the ice volume on earth, about 33 million cubic kilometres (7.9 million cubic miles) of total ice mass.

== Formation ==
Ice caps are formed when snow is deposited during the cold season and fails to completely melt during the hot season. Over time, the snow builds up and becomes dense, well-bonded snow known as perennial firn. Finally, the air passages between snow particles close off and transforms into ice.

The shape of an ice cap is determined by the landscape it lies on, as melting patterns can vary with terrain. For example, the lower portions of an ice cap are forced to flow outwards under the weight of the entire ice cap and will follow the downward slopes of the land.

== Global warming ==
Ice caps have been used as indicators of global warming, as increasing temperatures cause ice caps to melt and lose mass faster than they accumulate mass. Ice cap size can be monitored through different remote-sensing methods such as aircraft and satellite data.

Ice caps accumulate snow on their upper surfaces, and ablate snow on their lower surfaces. An ice cap in equilibrium accumulates and ablates snow at the same rate. The AAR is the ratio between the accumulation area and the total area of the ice cap, which is used to indicate the health of the glacier. Depending on their shape and mass, healthy glaciers in equilibrium typically have an AAR of approximately 0.4 to 0.8. The AAR is impacted by environmental conditions such as temperature and precipitation.

Data from 86 mountain glaciers and ice caps shows that over the long term, the AAR of glaciers has been about 0.57. In contrast, data from the most recent years of 1997–2006 yields an AAR of only 0.44. In other words, glaciers and ice caps are accumulating less snow and are out of equilibrium, causing melting and contributing to sea level rises.

Assuming the climate continues to be in the same state as it was in 2006, it is estimated that ice caps will contribute a 95 ± 29 mm rise in global sea levels until they reach equilibrium. However, environmental conditions have worsened and are predicted to continue to worsen in the future. Given that the rate of melting will accelerate, and by using mathematical models to predict future climate patterns, the actual contribution of ice caps to rising sea levels is expected to be more than double from initial estimates.

== Variants ==
High-latitude regions covered in ice, though strictly not an ice cap (since they exceed the maximum area specified in the definition above), are called polar ice caps; the usage of this designation is widespread in the mass media and arguably recognized by experts. Vatnajökull is an example of an ice cap in Iceland.

Plateau glaciers are glaciers that overlie a generally flat highland area. Usually, the ice overflows as hanging glaciers in the lower parts of the edges. An example is Biscayarfonna in Svalbard.

== See also ==
- Glacier
- Iceberg
- Ice cap climate
- Ice core
- Ice shelf
- List of glaciers in Russia
- Sea ice
