= Samarinvågen =

Bay in Svalbard, Norway

Coordinates: 76.9596°N 16.2403°E

Samarinvågen is a bay in Sørkapp Land at Spitsbergen, Svalbard. It is a southern bay of the fjord Hornsund, located between Meranfjellet and Traunkammen. The bay is named after Samarin, member of Arctic expeditions between 1899 and 1902. The glacier Samarinbreen debouches into the bay.

Samarinvågen's secluded location, coupled with the geological features such as the pieces of ice that come from a calving glacier nearby, give it a unique ambiance. The floating pieces of ice are the favorite haunt of bearded seals. The area also sees considerable numbers of seabirds. Species most commonly found here are little auk, Brünnich's guillemots, common and king eiders. Although extremely rare, white whales have been sighted here.
