= Chomjakovbreen =

Glacier in Svalbard, Norway

Coordinates: 76.9398°N 16.4291°E

Chomjakovbreen is a glacier in Sørkapp Land at Spitsbergen, Svalbard. It has a length of about nine kilometers, and is located between the mountain ridges of Bredichinryggen and Påskefjella. It debouches into the bay Svovelbukta at the southern side of Hornsund. The glacier is named after a participant of the Swedish-Russian Arc-of-Meridian Expedition from 1899 to 1902.
