= Möllerfjorden =

Fjord in Svalbard, Norway

Coordinates: 79°15′51″N 11°57′44″E

Möllerfjorden is the 9 kilometer long Eastern fjord branch of Krossfjorden located at the northwestern side of Spitsbergen, Svalbard. The fjord is named after astronomer Didrik Magnus Axel Möller. Möllerfjorden is separated from Lilliehöökfjorden by the peninsula and mountain ridge Kong Haakons Halvøy.
