= Samarinbreen =

Glacier in Svalbard, Norway

Coordinates: 76.8863°N 16.3455°E

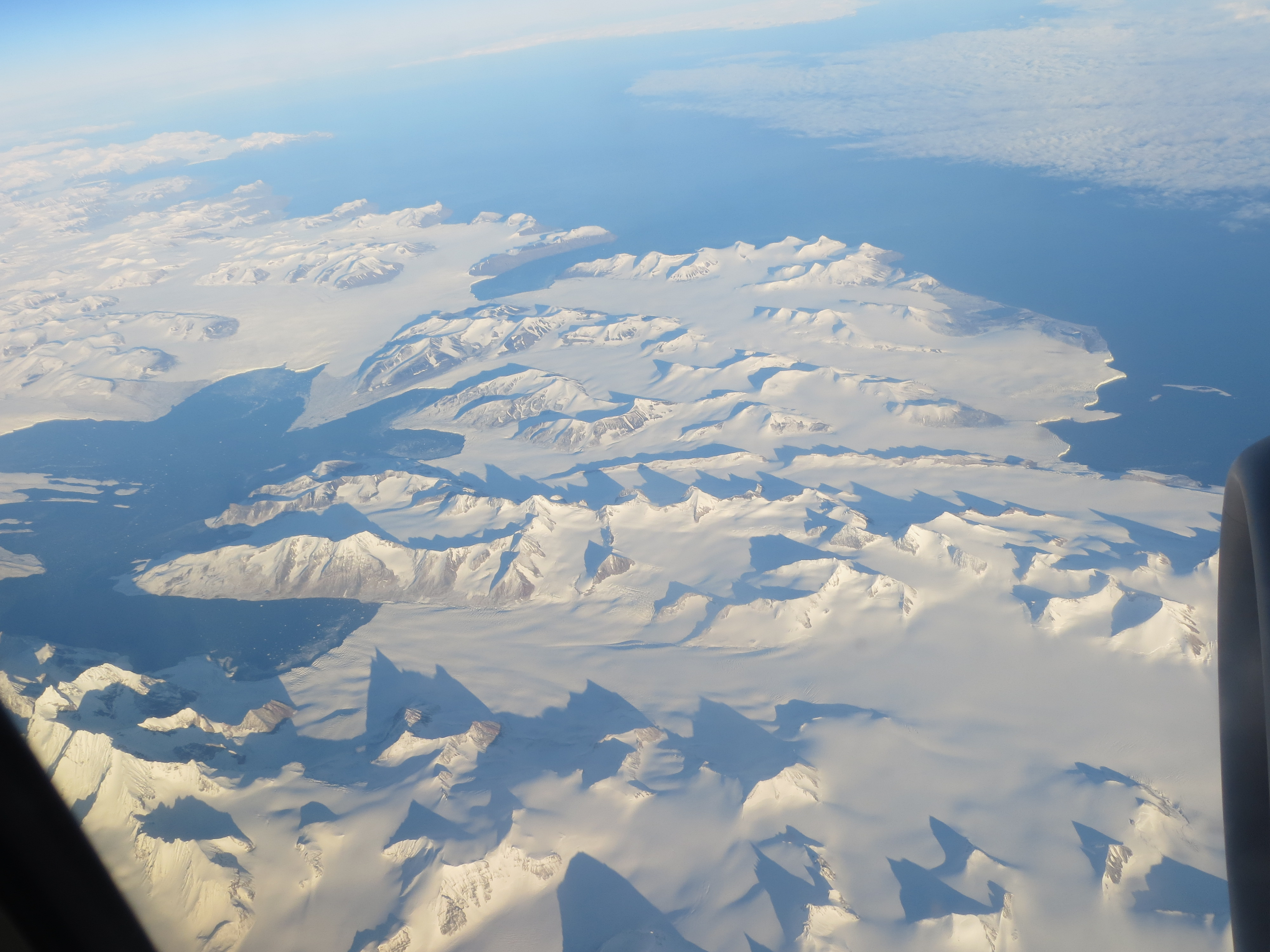
Hornsund, Samarinbreen, Olsokbreen

Samarinbreen is a glacier in Sørkapp Land at Spitsbergen, Svalbard. It has a length of 14 mi (23 km), and is the northern branch of Mefonna. The glacier debouches into Samarinvågen, a southern bay of the fjord Hornsund. The glacier is named after Samarin, the name of a craftsman, fisherman and member of Arctic expeditions between 1899 and 1902.
