= Haakon VII Land =

Area of Spitsbergen, Svalbard, Norway

Coordinates: 79°10′N 13°15′E

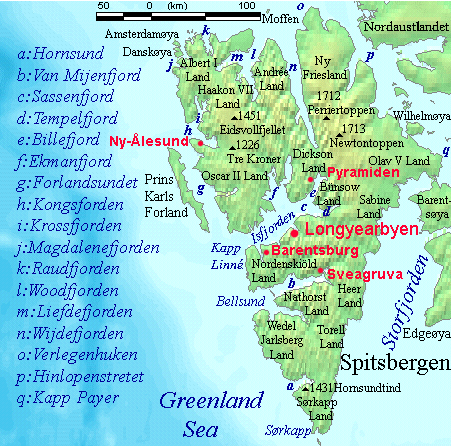
Haakon VII Land is located on the western side of Spitsbergen, between Woodfjorden and Kongsfjorden.

Haakon VII Land is a land area in the northwestern part of Spitsbergen, Svalbard (part of Norway), between Woodfjorden and Kongsfjorden.

The area was named (as French: Terre Haakon VII) after the then King of Norway, Haakon VII, by Gunnar Isachsen, who mapped the area in the first decade of the 20th century.

Haakon VII Land lies within Nordvest-Spitsbergen National Park. The highest mountain in Haakon VII Land is Eidsvollfjellet.
