= Sassenelva =

River of Spitsbergen, Norway

Coordinates: 78°20′32″N 16°51′06″E

Sassenelva is a river flowing through Sassendalen in Sabine Land at Spitsbergen, Svalbard. The river feeds from the glacier Rabotbreen and side glaciers of Nordmannsfonna and Hellefonna, and debouches into Sassenfjorden.
