= André Slomszynski =

French painter and illustrator

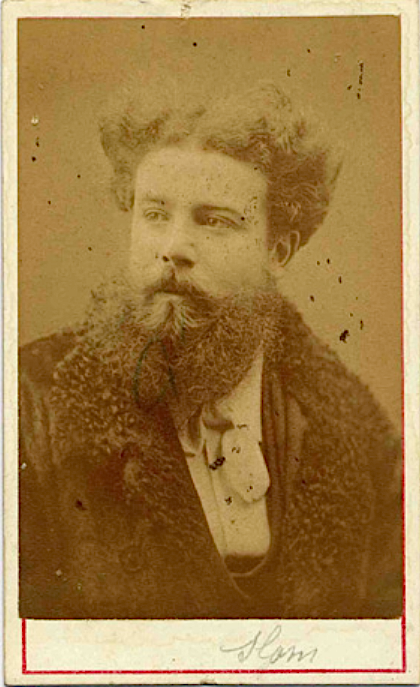
Photo of Slomszynski (Lausanne, about 1874)

André Amédée Gustave Slomszynski, Słomczyński or Slomczynski, known professionally as Slom (9 July 1844 – 27 December 1909), was a French painter, engraver, illustrator and cartographer of Polish origin. A former communard, he lived from 1871 to 1880 in exile in Switzerland.

== Biography ==
Slomczynski was born in Bordeaux, the son of Stanislas Słomczyński, a refugee Polish officer, and an unknown mother. He went to Paris during the Second Empire to learn painting. From 1855 to 1861 he was a pupil at the École polonaise de Paris at Batignolles.

He took part in the Paris Commune in 1871. As the secretary of Raoul Rigault, he was with him on 23 May 1871 when he was imprisoned in the prison of Sainte-Pélagie, at the moment when Gustave Chaudey, a former deputy mayor (adjoint) of Paris, was executed together with three gendarmes, the next day in the hôtel of the Rue Gay-Lussac, and when Rigault himself was shot dead by Versailles troops in the same street. After the Bloody Week (la semaine sanglante) in May 1871, he was sentenced to death by the Versailles army who accused him of inciting the Gardes nationaux to execute the three hostage gendarmes.

He managed to escape and took refuge in Switzerland, in Geneva. He settled in Lausanne and became the companion in misfortune of Eugène Protot, former minister of justice, who was similarly in exile, and of Maxime Vuillaume. On 31 December 1877, he was at the death bed of Gustave Courbet and executed the painter's funerary portrait. He gave evening classes on "imitative and ornamental drawing" (dessin d'imitation et d'ornementation) in Lausanne and then worked at Vevey with Élisée Reclus, for whom he illustrated several volumes of the Nouvelle Géographie universelle.

Once he had returned to France in 1881 under the amnesty, he drew for several French publications, including L'Illustration, the Monde illustré, Le Tour du monde, La Libre Revue, Paris illustré and the Suisse illustrée. Under the pseudonym "Slom", he signed many drawings which were published in connection with the Exposition universelle of 1889 the Eiffel Tower, the 1931 Paris Colonial Exhibition at the Esplanade des Invalides and the entrance gate to the Quai d'Orsay. In 1883, the poet Maurice Rollinat dedicated to him the poem Jalousie féline from the collection Les névroses. At the request of Pierre de Coubertin, in 1901 he designed the Olympic diploma for the International Olympic Committee.

He lived with his wife Emma (née Blank) at 26 Avenue des Gobelins, where he died on 27 December 1909. His daughter Olga Słomczyński (1881-1940), who stayed in Geneva with her mother, was a well-known illustrator in Switzerland.

== Works featuring Slom's illustrations ==
- Georges-Louis Rose, Les amoureux de Titine: chansonnette, words by Augustin Roussel; music by Georges Rose; sung by Melle Laure, P. Tralin, 1865, cover of score
- Populations de l'Asie du Nord, cartography by A. Slom, 1881
- Albert Pinard, Pile-de-Pont, Jules Lévy, 1886, collectif
- M. Génin [Mme de Roisel], Un petit héros, coll. "Petite Bibliothèque Blanche", Hetzel, [1890], with Adrien Marie
- J. Colomb [Joséphine-Blanche Bouchet], Histoires de bêtes, Hachette, 1890
- Olympe Gevin-Cassal, Mauviette chérie, May and Motteroz, [1890]
- Jeanne Cazin, Les aventures de Jean Le Savoyard: scènes de la montagne, Hachette, 1891
- Hans Christian Andersen, Contes, translation by Jules Gourdault, Hachette, 1892
- Albert Cim, Mes amis et moi, Hachette, 1893, with Alexandre Ferdinandus
- Marie Delorme, Le Théâtre chez grand'mère: saynètes, petites pièces de salon, proverbes, monologues, souhaits, etc., Armand Colin, 1895
- Charles Rabot, Un hiver à Corfou, Hachette, 1896, collectif
- Marcel Monmarché, Rocamadour et ses environs. Guide artistique du touriste et du pélerin, 1898
- Amélie Mesureur, Le Dernier des Pifferari; followed by Le Petit Mousse, Société française d'éditions d'art, 1904
- Albert Cim, Le roman d'un bon garçon [1904]
- Jacques Rinet, Daki, le romanichel, Albin Michel, no date
- La Nouvelle Géographie universelle, a 19-volume collection of geographical writing by Élisée Reclus published 1876-1894.
