= Morenedalen =

Valley of Spitsbergen, Norway

Coordinates: 78.0557°N 18.7703°E

Morenedalen is a valley in Sabine Land at Spitsbergen, Svalbard. The valley separates Myklegardfjellet from Agardhfjellet, and widens to the south to the coastal plain Belemnittsletta.
