= Sveigbreen =

Glacier in Svalbard, Norway

Coordinates: 78°06′36″N 17°42′00″E

Sveigbreen is a glacier stream in Sabine Land at Spitsbergen, Svalbard. It has a length of about eleven kilometers, and extends the southern part of the ice cap Hellefonna, south of Kropotkinfjellet. The glacier is one of the two main sources to the river Agardhelva, which flows through Agardhdalen towards Agardhbukta.
