= Bairdfjellet =

Mountain in Sabine Land, Svalbard

- Location within Svalbard

Highest point
- Elevation: 857 m (2,812 ft)
- Coordinates: 78°22′59″N 18°14′39″E

Geography
- Country: Norway
- Region: Svalbard

Bairdfjellet is a mountain in Sabine Land at Spitsbergen, Svalbard. It has a height of 857 m.a.s.l. and is situated between the glaciers of Hayesbreen and Fimbulisen/Rabotbreen.

== Name ==
The mountain is named after American naturalist Spencer Fullerton Baird.
