= Båtbogen =

Inlet in Svalbard, Norway

Coordinates: 78.0500°N 18.5837°E

Båtbogen (The boat bow) is a bay in Agardhbukta in Sabine Land at Spitsbergen, Svalbard. It is located east of Agardhelva and west of Belemnittsletta.
