= Roslagenfjellet =

Coordinates: 78.14°N 18.28°E

Roslagenfjellet is a mountain in Sabine Land at Spitsbergen, Svalbard. It is named after the Swedish district of Roslagen. The mountain is located north of the valley of Agardhdalen, and east of the glacier of Elfenbeinbreen.
