= Agardhaksla =

Mountain in Spitsbergen, Norway

- Location within Svalbard

Highest point
- Coordinates: 78.0801°N 18.9439°E

Geography
- Location: Spitsbergen, Norway

Agardhaksla is a peak in Sabine Land at Spitsbergen, Svalbard, Norway. It is a part of the mountain Agardhfjellet at the western side of Storfjorden, east of Myklegardfjellet. The peak is named after Swedish botanist Jacob Georg Agardh.
