= Rabotbreen =

Glacier in Svalbard, Norway

Coordinates: 78.3368°N 18.0820°E

Rabotbreen is a glacier in Sabine Land at Spitsbergen, Svalbard. The glacier is a tributary glacier to Fimbulisen, and is located in the upper part of Sassendalen. Nearby mountains are Bairdfjellet and Moskusryggen.

== Name ==
The glacier is named after French geographer and Arctic explorer Charles Rabot.
