= Elfenbeinbreen =

Glacier in Svalbard, Norway

Coordinates: 78°09′00″N 18°06′36″E

Elfenbeinbreen is a glacier stream in Sabine Land at Spitsbergen, Svalbard. It has a length of about twelve kilometers, and extends from the southern part of the ice cap Nordmannsfonna. The glacier is one of the two main sources to the river Agardhelva, which flows through Agardhdalen towards Agardhbukta.
