= Gaston Da Costa =

French educator and communard

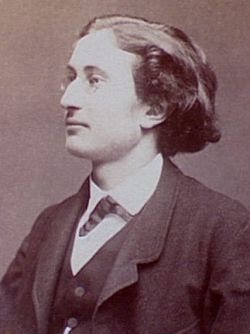
Da Costa in 1871

Gaston Pierre Da Costa (15 December 1850 – 11 December 1909) was a French teacher, left-wing militant and communard.

== Biography ==
Da Costa was born in Paris, the son of Eugène François Da Costa (1818–1888), teacher of mathematics, and his wife Adèle-Pauline (née Varenne). A follower of Auguste Blanqui while a student, in 1871, at the age of 20, Da Costa embraced the cause of the Paris Commune. He was deputy of the prosecutor Raoul Rigault, who was in charge of the police, and took part in the events in the capital until the fall of the insurgents.

It was Da Costa, accompanied by Eugène Protot, who implemented the decision of the Committee of Public Safety to destroy the house of Adolphe Thiers. In the face of the hostility of the crowd and the reluctance of the workmen commandeered to undertake the demolition, he struck the first blows of the pickaxe on the building's chimneys, while Protot broke the windows on the veranda. It required the arrival of a company of the communard Garde Nationale unit the "Vengeurs de Flourens" to disperse the hostile demonstration and to induce the workmen to start work.

Da Costa was arrested at La Varenne-Saint-Hilaire in June 1871 and was tried in July 1872 on charges of "violent action with the aim of changing the form of government, complicity in assassination, illegal arrests with threats of death". The council of war sentenced him to death. After an appeal for review which confirmed the initial judgement, and a further appeal to the Commission for Pardons, the sentence was commuted in January 1873 to forced labour for life in the penal colony of New Caledonia, where he was sent without delay.

After the amnesty of 1880 he was repatriated on board the Loire, which reached Brest on 7 June 1881, after which he occupied himself with pedagogical matters. In 1889 he published the Nouvelle méthode d'enseignement de la grammaire française, which was approved by the municipal council of Paris. This work was followed by several handbooks for the use of pupils in primary schools, of which the last appeared in 1906. He was close to the left wing of the Boulangistes in 1889. He also shared the convictions of Ernest Granger, Ernest Roche and Henri Rochefort and joined the Comité central socialiste révolutionnaire (CCSR).

In 1904 he published his memoirs of the events in which he had taken part, while enlarging the viewpoint to the scale of historical analysis. The three volumes of La Commune vécue, 30 years after the facts, provoked many reactions not only from his opponents but also from former communards.

He died on 11 December 1909 at Bois-le-Roi.

== Works ==
- Nouvelle méthode d'enseignement de la grammaire française, revised and corrected by Jeannin, Paris, 1894
- Mémoires d'un communard: 18 Mars–28 Mai 1871, La Commune vécue (vol. 1 online; vol. 2 online; vol.3 online).
  - Mémoires d'un communard: 18 mars–28 mai 1871, La Commune vécue, Larousse, 2009, 383 pp. ISBN 9782035848352 — condensed into one volume.

== Bibliography ==
- La Commune, Éditions Sociales, 1970
