= Fimbul =

Fimbul is an Old Norse word often used as a prefix for "giant" or "mighty", which is found in:

- Fimbulwinter (Old Norse: Fimbulvetr), a heavy winter that preludes the events of Ragnarök
  - Volcanic winter of 536, a 6th century volcanic winter in Europe, in modern Swedish often called "Fimbulwinter"

== Geography ==
- Fimbul Glacier, Greenland
- Fimbul Ice Shelf, Antarctica
- Fimbulheimen, Antarctica
- Fimbulisen, Svalbard
