= Moskusryggen =

Mountain ridge in Sabine Lane, Spitsbergen, Svalbard

Coordinates: 78.3200°N 17.9950°E

Moskusryggen is a mountain ridge in Sabine Land at Spitsbergen, Svalbard. The mountain has a relatively flat top, and is about eight kilometer long with a width of about 2.5 kilometers. It is located west of the glacier Rabotbreen.
