= Belemnittsletta =

Coastal plain of Spitsbergen, Norway

Coordinates: 78.0380°N 18.7620°E

Belemnittsletta is a coastal plain in Sabine Land at Spitsbergen, Svalbard. It is located east of the bay Båtbogen, below the mountains of Myklegardfjellet and Agardhfjellet, and has an extension of about five kilometers. The plain is named after the fossil group Belemnitida.
