= Skruisbreen =

Glacier in Svalbard, Norway

Coordinates: 78.1552°N 17.7635°E

Skruisbreen is a glacier in Sabine Land at Spitsbergen, Svalbard. It has a length of about seven kilometers, and is a branch of Hellefonna. A nearby mountain is Kropotkinfjellet.
