= Kropotkinfjellet =

Mountain in Svalbard, Norway

Coordinates: 78.1313°N 17.9073°E

Kropotkinfjellet is a mountain in Sabine Land at Spitsbergen, Svalbard. It has an extension of about seven kilometers, with two glaciated peaks, and is located between the glaciers of Sveigbreen and Skruisbreen. The mountain is named after Russian prince and scientist Peter Kropotkin.
