= Crimes de la commune =

Paris commune photos

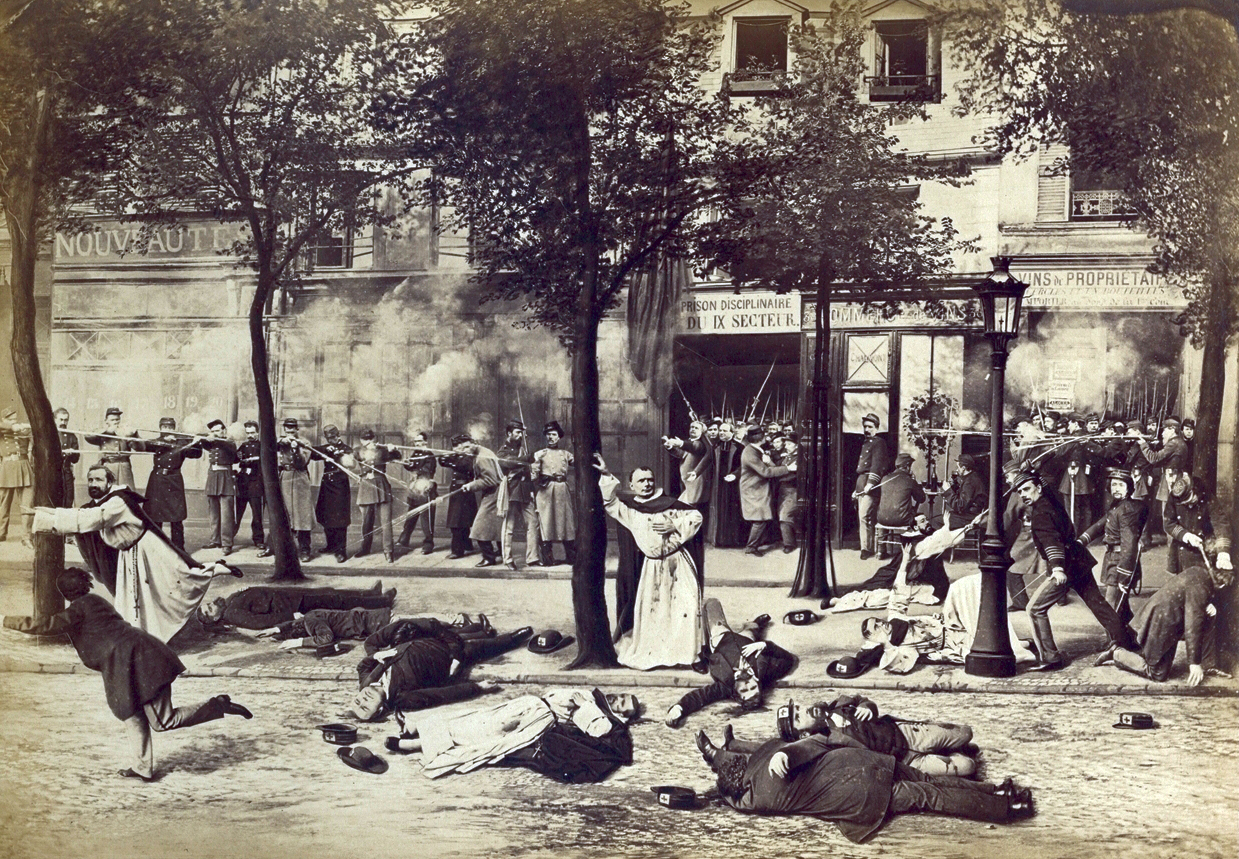
Massacre of dominicans in Arcueil, photomontage, Metropolitan Museum of Art.

Crimes de la Commune is a series of photomontages produced by French photographer Ernest-Charles Appert at the end of the Paris Commune. A Parisian photographer accredited to the Tribunal de la Seine, and sometimes cited as the forerunner of bertillonage, he photographed Communards incarcerated in Versailles and used these portraits in photomontages. This practice of committed photomontage is the subject of much debate. Furthermore, these photographs raise issues of both commercial practice and copyright.

== Ernest-Charles and Eugène-Léon Appert ==
Eugène-Léon Appert (born March 30, 1830, in Châteauroux, died March 4, 1905, in Médan) and Ernest-Charles Appert (born September 10, 1831 in Châteauroux, died January 15, 1890, in Paris) were the natural sons of domestic servant Anne Appert. They left Châteauroux at an undetermined date to work in photography in Paris. The two brothers shared the same initial and merged under the same business identity, that of Eugène Ernest Appert. They apprenticed in the studio of Émile Defonds, a founding member of the Société française de photographie, with Alphonse Bousseton, a former miniature painter. Eugène Appert was listed in the Commerce and Industry directory in 1854. Initially an apprentice, he became Bousseton's partner in 1862. In 1868, in the midst of the economic crisis, he set up his own workshop at 24 rue Taitbout, in what was then the photographers' studio district.

The Appert brothers specialized in portrait photography of political figures, and Ernest-Charles was an early practitioner of photomontage (Blois trial in July 1870, (Note: The photograph is entitled The High Court of Justice sitting in Blois in 1870 for the plot against the life of Napoleon III.) dealing with various plots against the life of Napoleon III, involving Gustave Flourens and Eugène Protot). They took part in the Universal Exhibitions of 1862 and 1867.

According to Stéphanie Sotteau Soualle, (Note: In 2010, Stéphanie Sotteau Soualle defended her doctoral thesis entitled "Appert, photographe parisien: atelier et actualité (1860-1890).") a systematic inventory of Appert's images confirms that Ernest-Charles was the author of the series of photomontages, the Crimes de la Commune.

== Appert and the Paris Commune ==
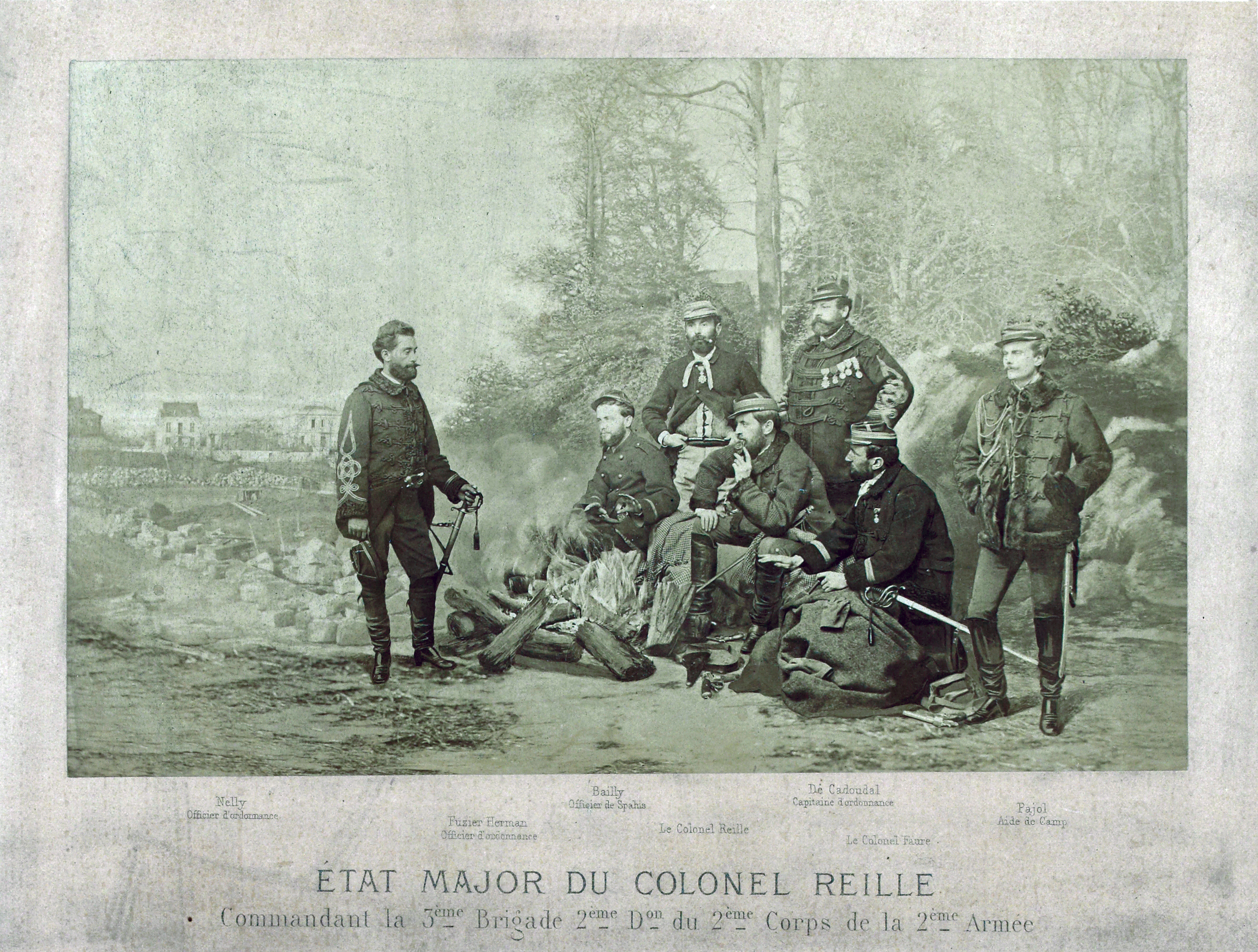
Siège of Paris, Bondy's outpost, December 20, 1870. Musée Carnavalet.

During the siege of Paris in the 1870 war, Appert photographed French and Prussian officers in the forts around Paris. One or other of the brothers worked for the Ministry of Justice as an expert for the Tribunal de la Seine, as a court photographer, (Note: Appert introduced himself successively as "Photographer to the Judiciary" in 1868, then as "Expert to the Seine Court" after September 1870, and finally as "Eugène Appert Photographie Expert".) and was thus able to take many photographs of prisoners. During the Paris Commune, he seems to have sided with the "Versaillais" against the "Communards". On behalf of Thiers and his regime, he took a large number of photos of Versailles repression, both in the field and in Versailles prisons.

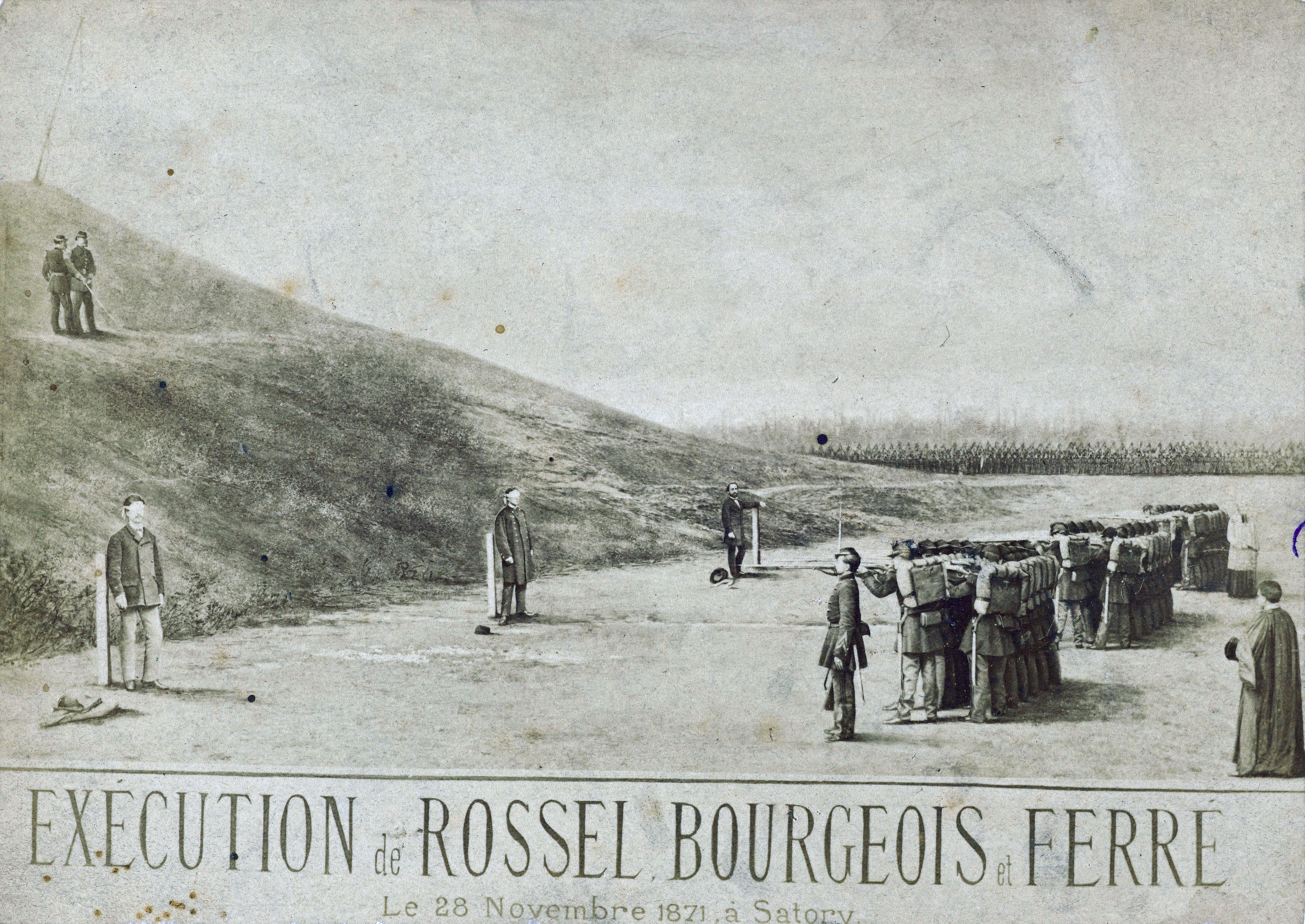
Execution of Rossel, Bourgeois and Ferré, November 28, 1871 at Satory. Albumen print, Paris, Musée Carnavalet.

In early 1872, Appert published the album Crimes de la Commune.

It has often been claimed that Appert was a Versaillais, or even a Bonapartist, because after the fall of Napoleon III, Appert published numerous propaganda photomontages depicting the major events of the Bonapartist clan. He was even condemned in 1874 for celebrating the prince's majority.

He also shot a photomontage the execution of Louis Rossel, Pierre Bourgeois and Théophile Ferré at the Satory camp by the Versailles army.

However, while the photomontages in Crimes de la Commune justified Adolphe Thiers's repressive policies, the photomontages of the imperial prince served as Bonapartist propaganda, and Appert later celebrated the Republicans' electoral successes.

For Jean-Claude Gautrand, Appert was "the most Versaillais of photographers", but for Stéphanie Sotteau Soualle, this photographer, who had links with the army, the papacy – he produced a series of portraits of Pope Leo XIII, elected in 1878 – the political class and the press, (Note: He published his portraits uninterruptedly, over some thirty years, in both Le Monde illustré and l'Illustration.) seems above all "a commercial photographer who managed to survive the Second Empire, the Franco-Prussian War, the National Defense government, the Civil War and the ups and downs of the Third Republic, while keeping his studio in business. [...] Before being a 'Versailles', Bonapartist or Republican partisan, he is above all an opportunistic professional who has created a network of relationships and reacts effectively to events", and who demonstrates a "spirit of adaptation to political circumstances".

== Appert in the origins of forensic identification ==
=== Portraits of imprisoned communards ===
Appert enjoyed a privileged relationship with the Prefecture of Police. Appointed by the judicial authorities to photograph the Rue Haxo, the scene of a confused hostage execution during the Bloody Week, he also obtained permission to photograph inmates of the Versailles prisons, notably Louise Michel and Charles Lullier. His portraits are, according to Jeannene Przyblyski, "poignant images", showing inmates oscillating between defiance and the quest for respectability. Éric Fournier notes that "some pose with a somewhat resigned pride, no doubt as a final challenge".

Portraits of communards

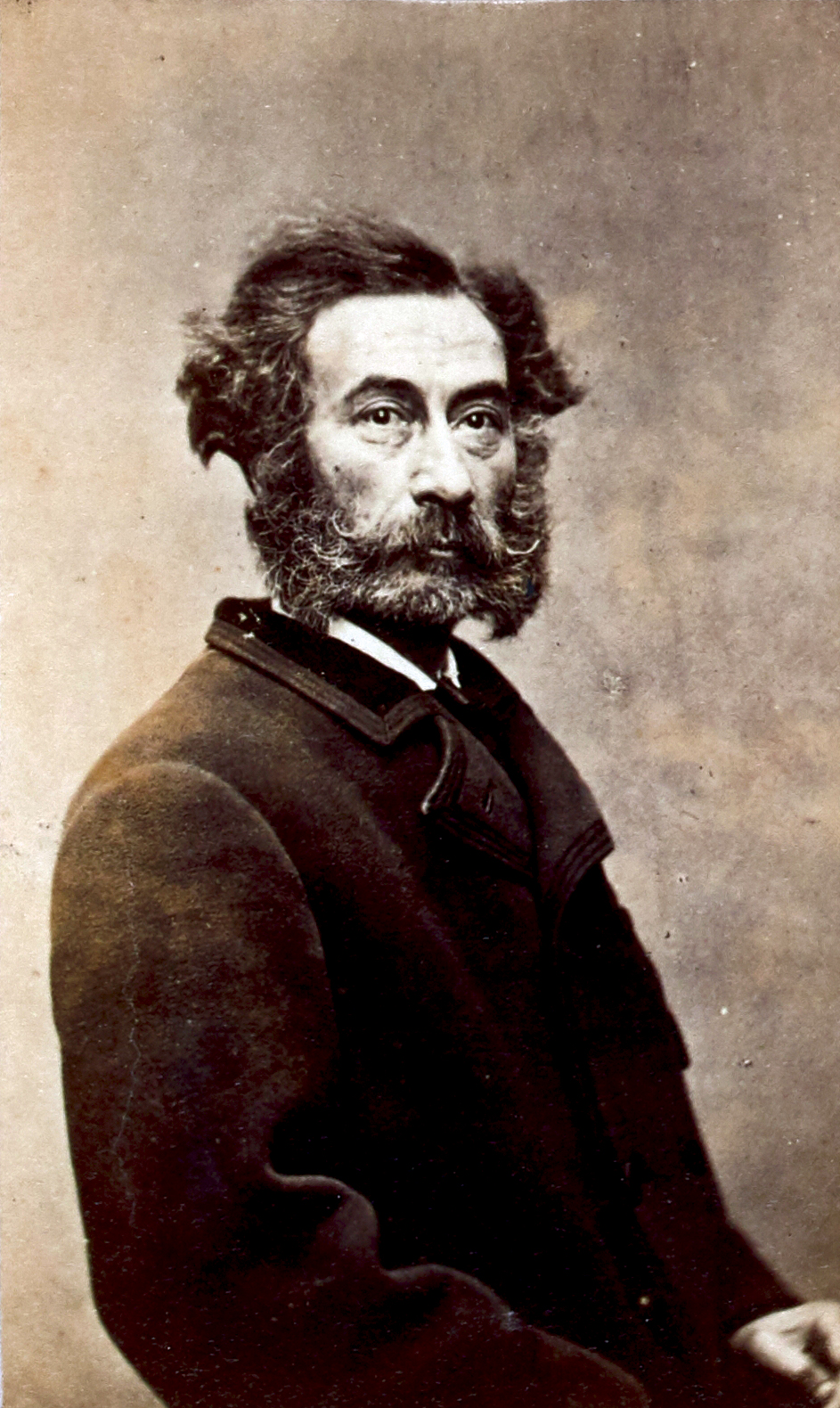
Charles Simon Mayer, Major Commandant of the Place Vendôme.

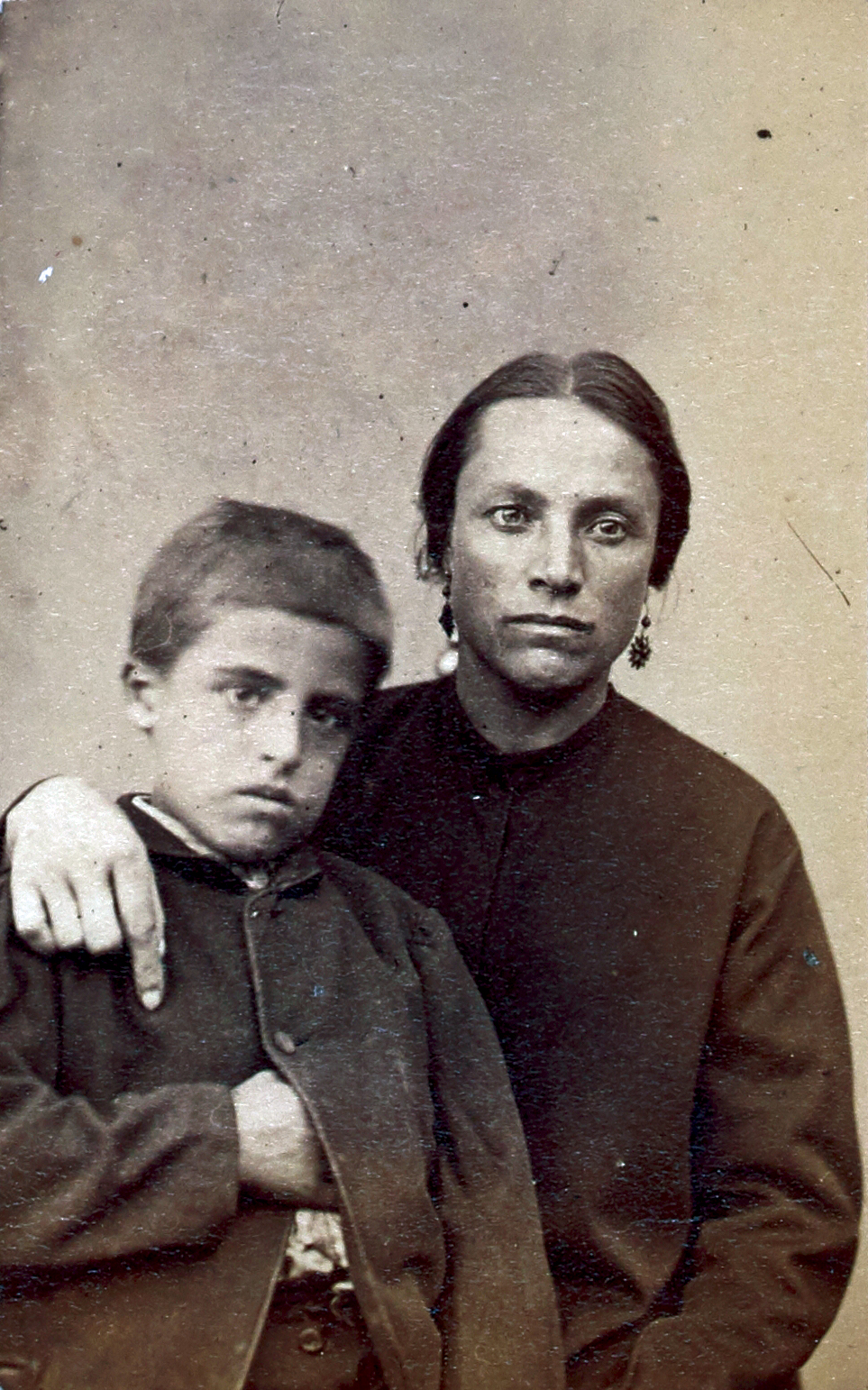
Portrait of Euphanie Damiens with her son, captured in Versailles prison.

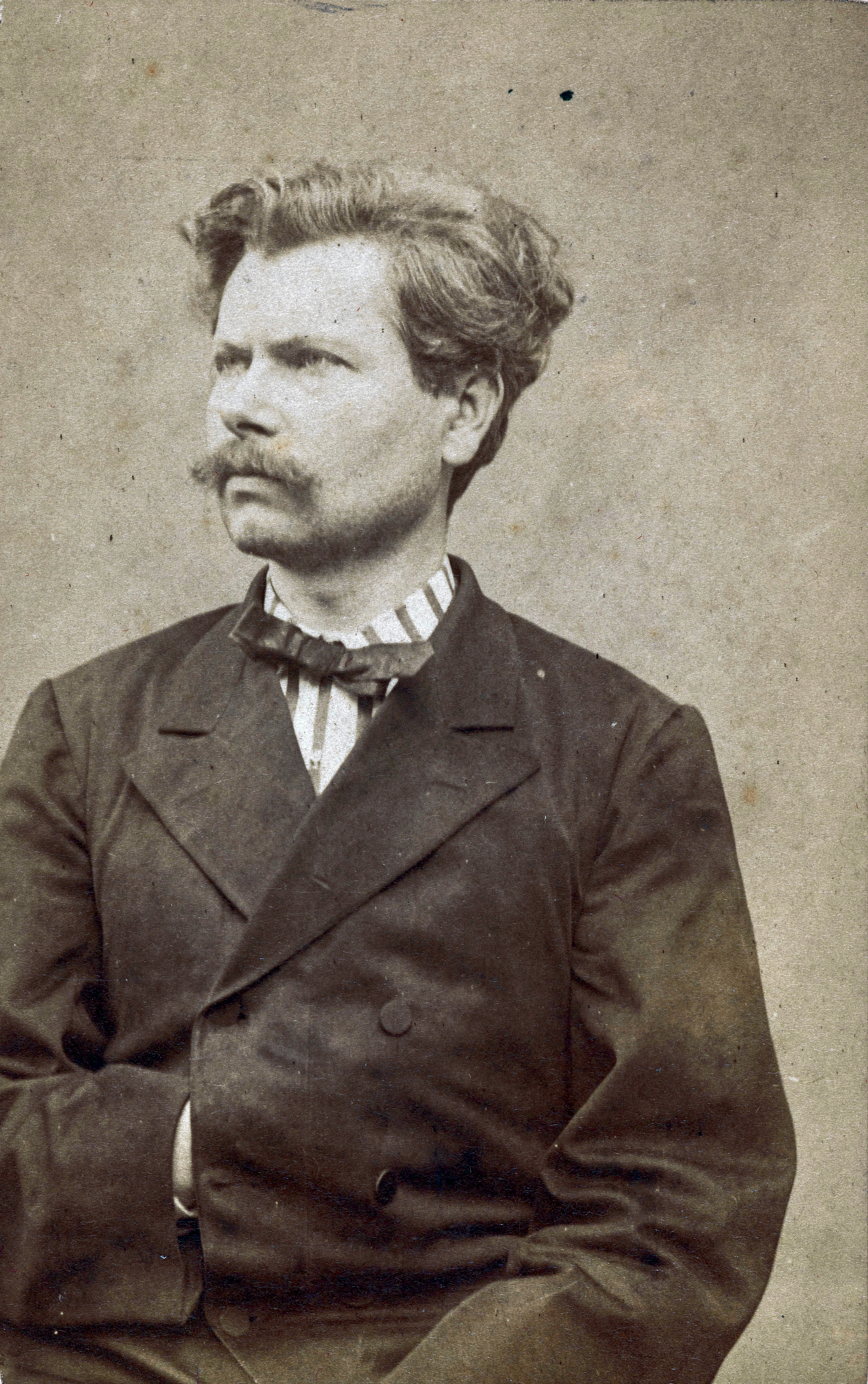
Portrait of Charles Ernest Lullier, Communard.

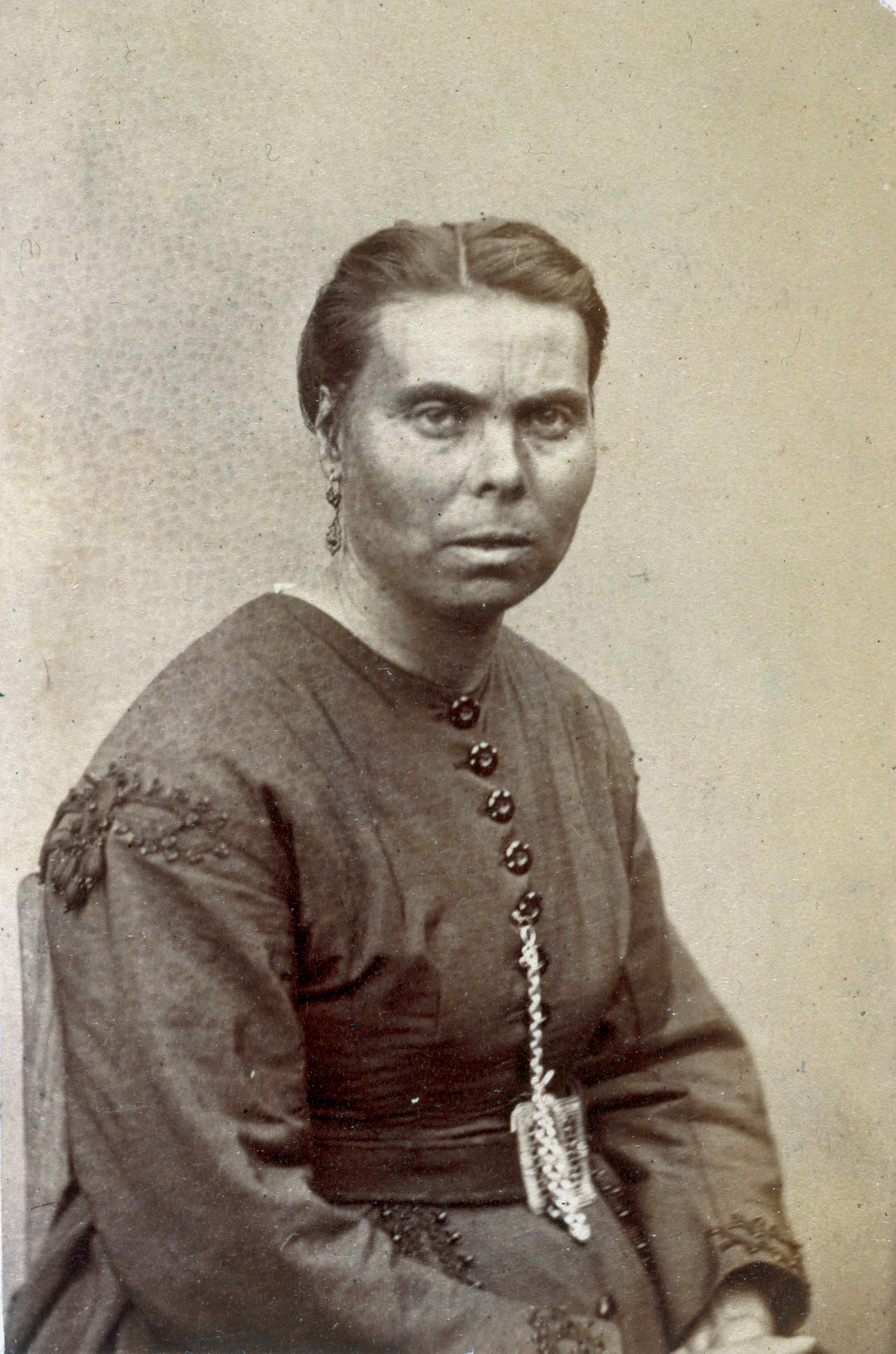
Portrait of Louise Tautin in Versailles prison.

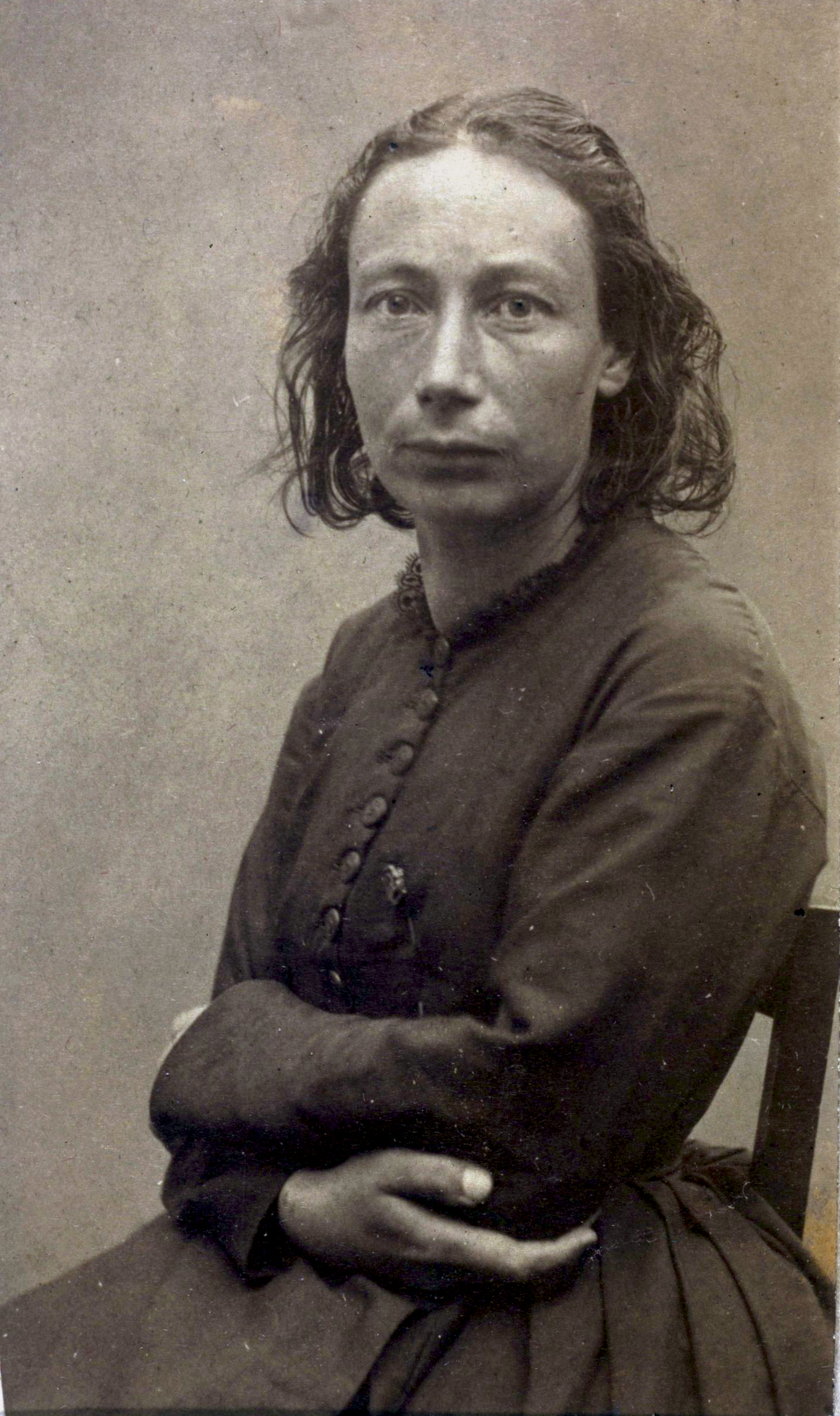
Portrait of Louise Michel taken at the Chantiers de Versailles prison. The cardboard box contains the inscription "Louise Michel, leader of the incendiaires", Musée Carnavalet.

As early as the 19th century, (Note: In July 1871, for example, Le Charivari reported that "photography is of great service to the police: collodion is responsible for all the arrests being made at the moment ".) it was often said that "the Versailles authorities also used photography to control and identify Communards", and Gisèle Freund even went so far as to say that, while Communards willingly allowed themselves to be photographed in front of the barricades, "those who were recognized from these images by Thiers' police officers were almost all shot. It was the first time in history that photography was used as a police informer". Since the Second Empire, photography has legitimized itself as an auxiliary of public order.

In fact, the "Missel des communards" marks a turning point in the police use of photography. According to Pierre Piazza, it was the Prefecture of Police who commissioned Appert to take portraits of Communards incarcerated in Versailles. For Éric Heilmann, "the first systematic file-keeping operation was carried out in 1871 by the military justice system, in an attempt to identify Commune militants." The practice gradually spread: portraits, often of mediocre quality, were gradually added to convict files and intelligence cards. According to Christine Lapostolle, in reference to Alphonse Bertillon, this was "bertillonnage avant la lettre".

For Christian Phéline, Appert's portraits of Communards were a forerunner of Alphonse Bertillon's forensic photography. By organizing a vast photo campaign in the prisons of Versailles, he was responding to a government order to identify "communards" and enable them to be hunted down. Appert inaugurated "a mode of figuration defined by its own functionality: the inmates are identically represented seated, in front of the light background of a wall ". Generally speaking, the history of photography assumes that Appert perfected this "judicial" genre by photographing the inmates of Versailles prisons in 1871. In 1874, in a "climate of social reaction" after the crushing of the insurrection, a photographic service was created at the Paris police headquarters.

=== First photomontages ===
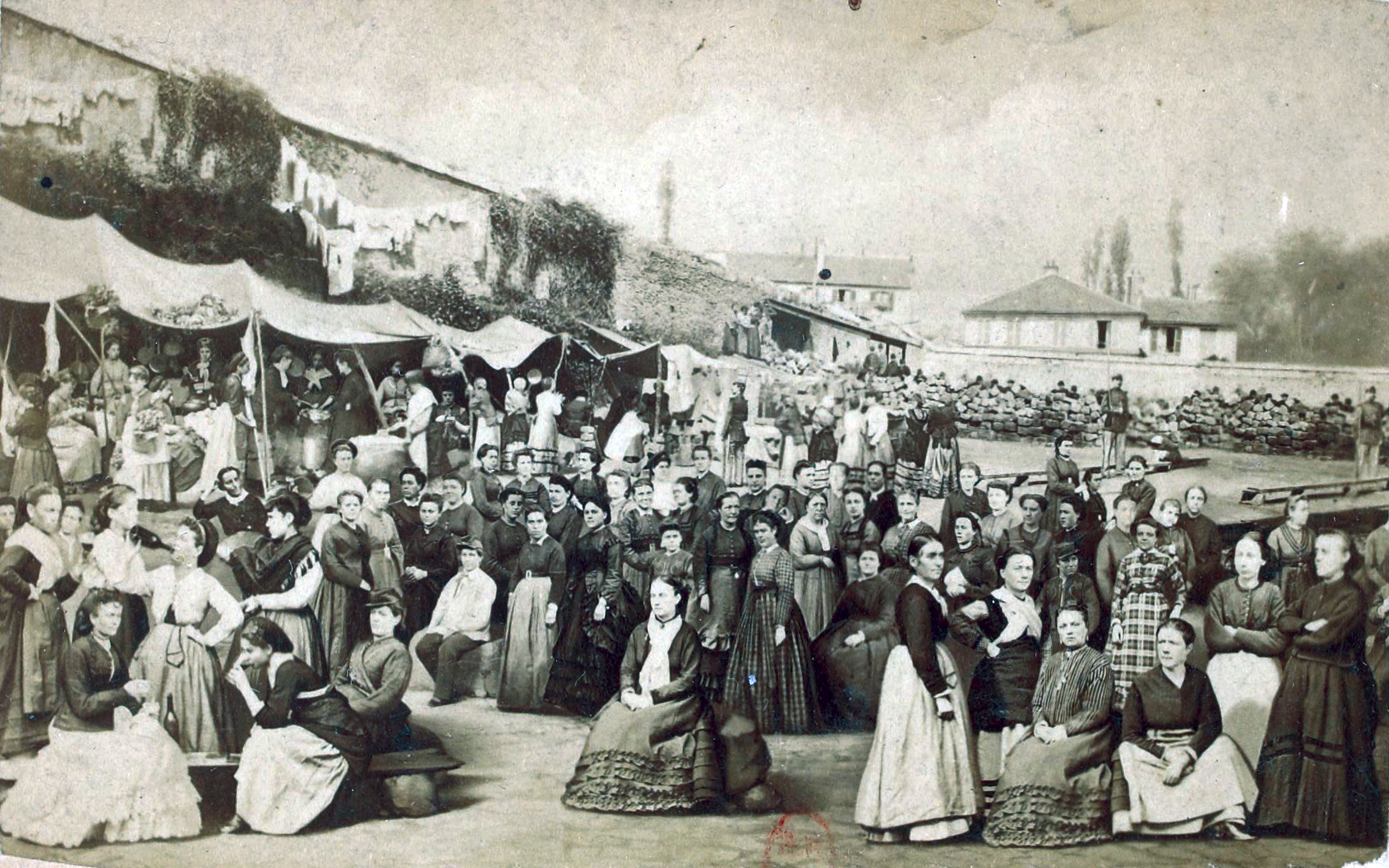
Des femmes de la Commune, photomontage of women incarcerated at the Chantiers prison in Versailles, Musée Carnavalet.

Appert then exploited the prisoners' portraits commercially in his photomontages, in which he featured the protagonists. Women photographed individually in the courtyard of the Chantiers prison are featured in the photomontage Des femmes de la Commune. For Christine Lapostolle, it's difficult to know whether Appert was inventing or adopting a practice already in use under Napoleon III, or even in other countries, a practice that until then had been applied only to artistic photography.

For Emmanuèle Peyret, "Eugène Appert used the busts and heads from the photos during their incarceration, then cut, pasted and re-pasted them. Well treated, despite their vices (one of them drinks from the bottle, whereas in the original photo she's holding a cigar), their insolence and vulgarity (hand on hip, provocative attitude). The result of the trickery is, dare we say it, truer than life, although a few details betray the deception: in the front row, the same dress twice, in the background, the same shot of soldiers twice, and one of the women has kept her military cap. Very well executed propaganda to continue damaging the image of these courageous women."

Appert had already adopted this portrait style in 1869: the portrait of Garnier-Pagès, registered for legal deposit on July 27, 1869, was used after the Commune, in 1881, in the photomontage depicting the deputies of the Seine. The photomontage technique stems from the Anglo-Saxon tradition: Appert combined fragments of portraits with actors' bodies, posing them in natural settings. The drawing is only visible in the form of retouching to bind the whole together. In this way, he artificially brought together members of parliament, ministers or the protagonists of a court case, such as the Troppmann case in 1869 or the Victor Noir case in 1870. This practice places him in the dual tradition of the fictitious group portrait in engraving on the one hand, and history painting on the other. It enabled him to free himself from the rules of studio portraiture, which had their origins in the Second Empire and were theorized by Disdéri in his treatise on the Art of Photography.

== Crimes de la Commune ==
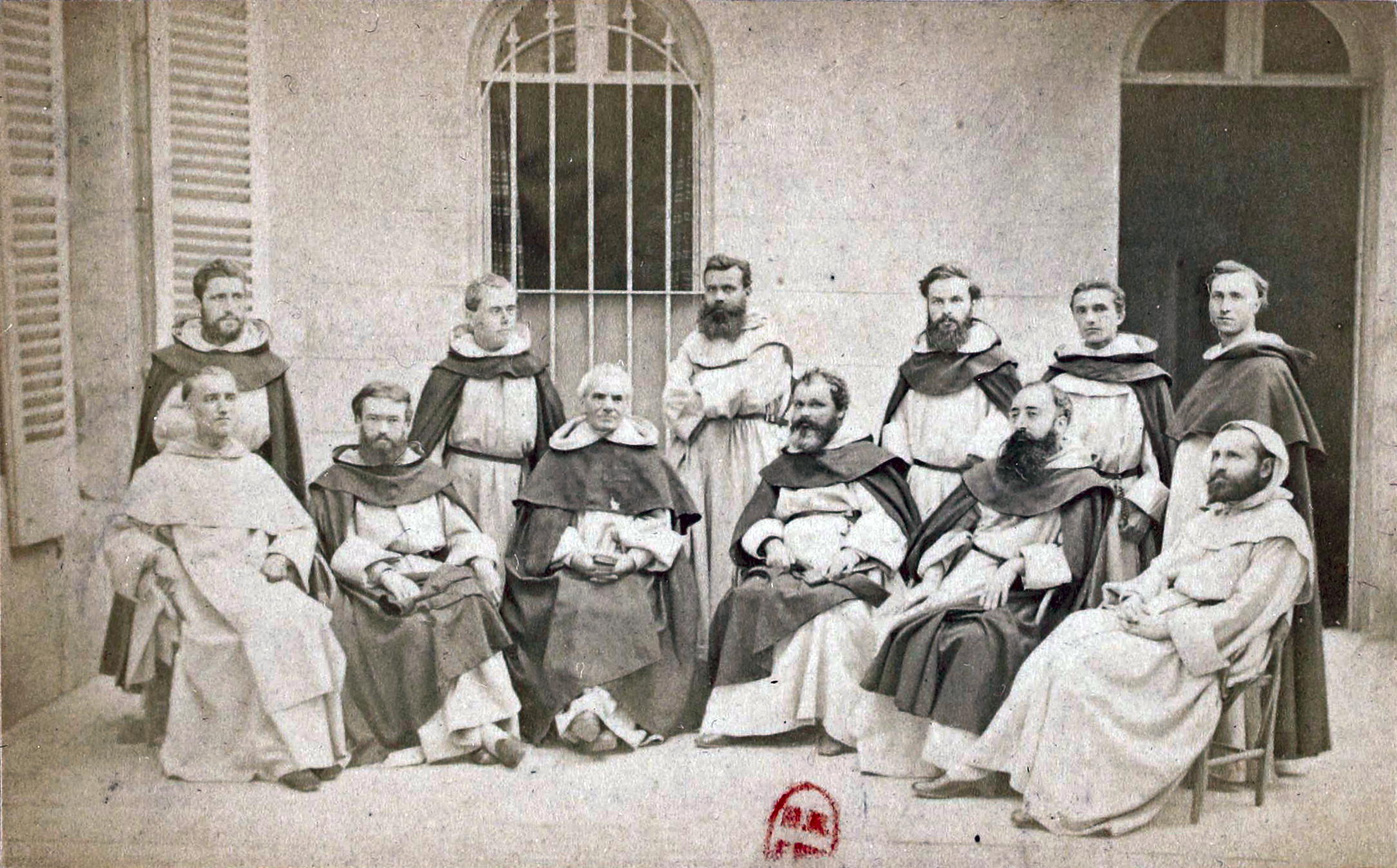
Dominicans of Arcueil who escaped the massacre.

The Crimes de la Commune series, whose albumen prints. (Note: In July 1871, for example, Le Charivari reported that "photography is of great service to the police: collodion is responsible for all the arrests being made at the moment.") are kept at the Musée Carnavalet, features seven photomontages and one photograph (Note: According to André Rouillé and Bernard Marbot, the collective title "Crimes de la Commune" applies to six photomontages "at least" out of a total production of some thirty photomontages,33 while in 2012 Mia Fineman lists nine photomontages in the series.) – that of the Arcueil Dominicans who escaped the massacre – created over the course of a year, starting on July 29, 1871. Three later photomontages show the punishment of the insurgents, from internment – "Prison des Chantiers, Versailles" – to the epilogue of November 28, 1871 – "Execution of Rossel, Bourgeois," "Ferré on the plain of Satory – via the judgment" and "Third Council of War of Versailles."

The photomontages, sold in three different formats, from large plates to cartes de visite, met with some success until they were banned in autumn 1872.

=== Sources and inspiration ===
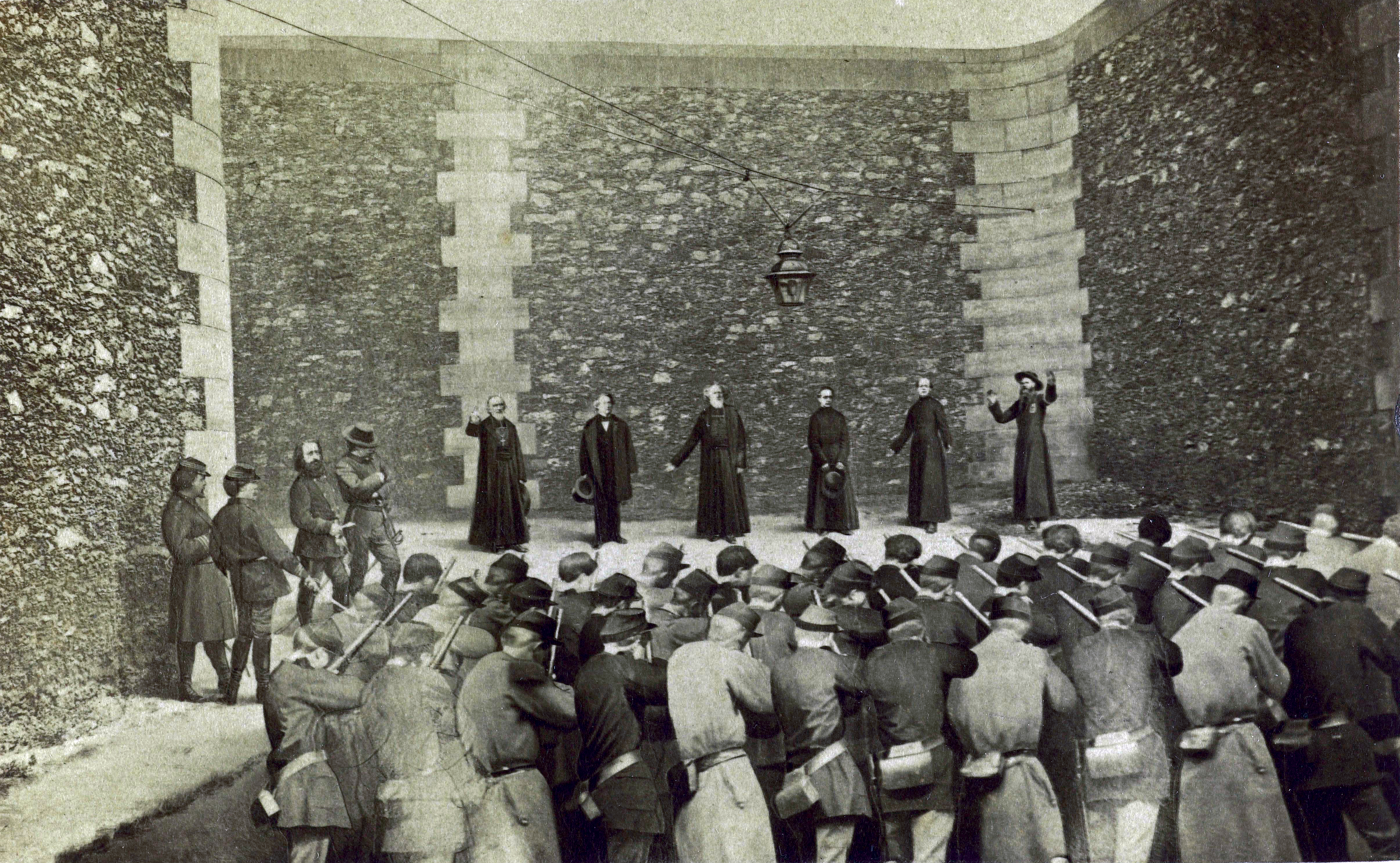
Assassination of Commune hostages at the Roquette prison, photomontage, albumen print, Musée Carnavalet.

The sources of inspiration for this work are diverse. The theme of execution evokes that of the Mexican emperor Maximilian in 1867, which had given rise to an abundant photographic output, notably in "L'Exécution des otages", prison de la Roquette. Appert favors the term "assassination", and stages a group of executors, the masses, against the individual who occupies the rank of hero or martyr. For the "Massacre des Dominicains d'Arcueil," Appert drew on the codes of religious iconography, still very popular at the time due to the profusion of Epinal images. The central figure in the photomontage is clearly inspired by the martyrdom of Saint Sebastian. Appert drew his inspiration mainly from contemporary published engravings, notably for his first two photomontages, (Note: "Assassination of Generals Clément-Thomas and Lecomte" and "Execution of Hostages, Roquette Prison", July 29, 1871. dez) which take their composition from engravings published in L'Illustration. Lastly, the photographer gathered testimonies from former hostages, which he endeavored to faithfully convey in his choice of details, such as Gustave Chaudey's robe, or Georges Darboy's long beard, which he added by drawing on an older portrait of the archbishop. Appert also repeats a number of criticisms of the insurgents, as he had read them in the press. Maxime Du Camp's description of Communards as "obtuse brutes who understand nothing, except that they have good pay, lots of wine and too much brandy" is echoed in the image of national guards seated on terraces, indifferent to the execution they are witnessing; or in the image of the inmate of the Chantiers prison who drinks straight from the bottle. Anti-Communard imagery recurrently features stereotypes of the "obscene, hideous, ferocious" Parisian woman, the "cantinières, pétroleuses, ambulancières" that Appert portrays in "L'Assassinat de 62 otages rue Haxo," with one woman even appearing to command the shot, perched on a horse.

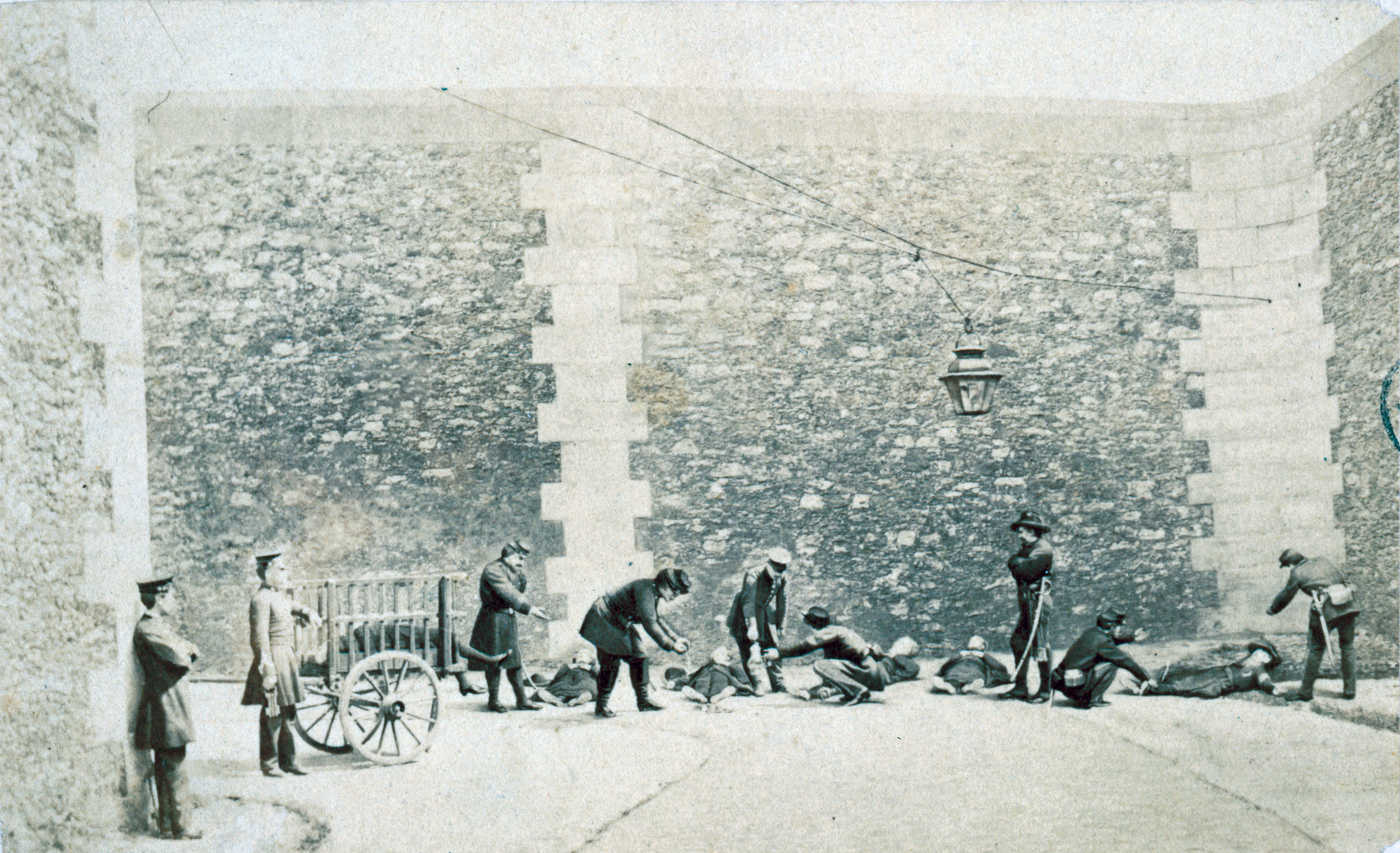
Removal of the bodies of the Archbishop of Paris, ^{Mgr} Darboy, and the clerics executed by the Commune on May 24, 1871, Musée Carnavalet.

Georges Darboy, Archbishop of Paris, appears in three of Appert's photomontages. (Note: These are "Georges Darboy in his prison cell in la Roquette," "Murder of the communes hostages in Roquette," and "Assassinat des otages de la Commune à la prison de la Roquette," and "Removal of the bodies of the Archbishop of Paris, ^{Mgr} Darboy, and the clerics executed by the Commune on May 24, 1871.") He was arrested by the Commune on April 4, 1871, the day before the hostage decree was voted. On April 12, as a hostage of the Commune, he wrote to Thiers to "protest against the summary executions committed by the Versaillais", and to propose his exchange for Auguste Blanqui, a prisoner in Morlaix. On May 14, the Commune offered to exchange all its hostages – some 70 of them – for Blanqui alone, but Thiers refused. According to historian Pierre Milza, "this was the way for Versailles to create martyrs for itself." Darboy was executed on May 24 during Semaine sanglante ("Bloody Week"), in Roquette Prison. He was joined by President Bonjean, Abbé Deguerry, parish priest of the Madeleine, and Abbé Surat, archdeacon of Notre-Dame.

The series gave rise to a series of divergent analyses, with art historian Francis Haskell pointing out that "although photography is intrinsically no less ambiguous than other categories of image, it is doubtful whether even today these limitations have been generally recognized, whether in our own time or, a fortiori, in those that preceded it."

=== Photomontage as a form of manipulation ===
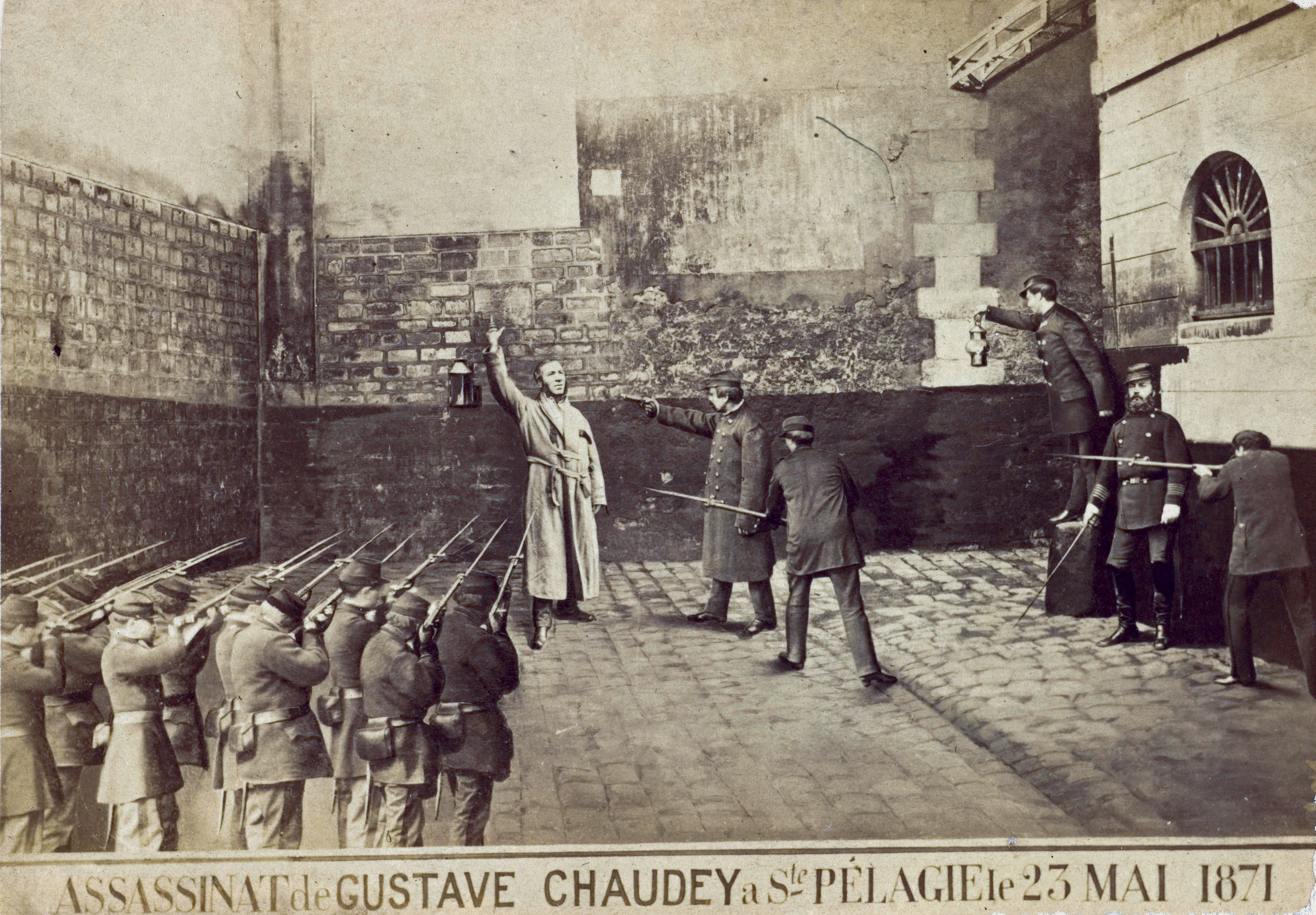
Murder of Gustave Chaudey in Sainte-Pélagie prison, photomontage, albumen print, Musée Carnavalet.

The practice of photomontage raises a number of questions. Appert's technique had no equivalent in France at the time, and both his attention to detail and the quality of his workmanship seem to testify first and foremost to manipulation.

Photomontage first poses problems of credibility: in the scene of the Dominicains of Arcueil, the photographer is supposed to be standing under the very fire of the Communards; the size of several characters frequently seems unrealistic. Appert's results are highly variable: his perspective is distorted in Assassinat de Gustave Chaudey, and it's hard to discern any technical progression throughout the series, with Appert appearing over time to be "more concerned with dramatization than veracity." The most plausible photomontage, in terms of form, remains that of "Assassinat des généraux Thomas et Lecomte."

For Daniel Salles, exhibition curator at the Bibliothèque nationale de France, the Crimes de la Commune series "falsifies reality" and is a part of a manipulation. For Girardin and Pirker, Appert's approach remains ambiguous, not least because he also employs actors or extras whom he asks to assume a studied pose – for example, the attitude typical of the martyrdom of Saint Sebastian is clearly recognizable – to add them to his composition. For media historian Laurent Bihl, too, "the series [...] uses photomontage to produce a falsified image and pretend it's a real photograph bearing witness to the crimes" of the Communards."

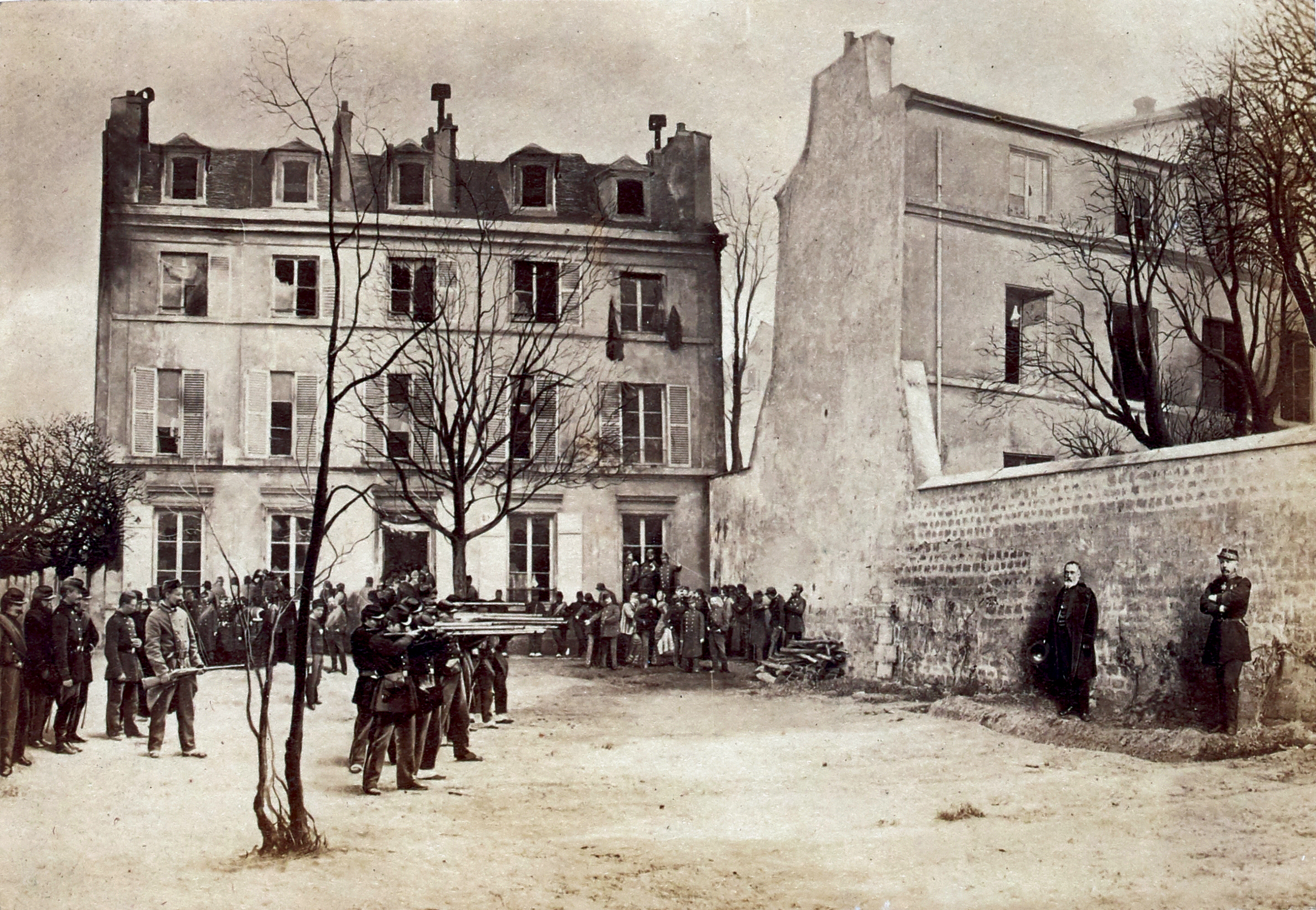
Assassination of Generals Clément-Thomas and Claude Lecomte, photomontage, albumen print, Musée Carnavalet.

What's more, the image is not isolated: on the contrary, it is part of a narrative, a staging that highlights the successive stages or scenes of a single event, taking its inspiration from history painting. Appert "hesitates between the status of objectivity linked to the medium and that of subjective narration made possible by reconstitutions and photomontage."

From the outset, photomontage was intended to incriminate the Communards, as the title of the photographic series indicates. In a style very different from French photographer Jules Raudnitz's series, Le Sabbat rouge however, the aim is still to equate the Paris Commune with a bad fever, or a fit of insanity requiring rigorous treatment. Leaving behind the tone of a pamphlet, Appert's claim to objectivity and accuracy is quite ostentatious, particularly in the title of his proofs. (Note: For example, the title of the photomontage "Monseigneur Darboy, archbishop of Paris, in cell 23" reads: "On the door window, Monseigneur Darboy, before walking to his torture, drew a few lines in Latin, which the photograph has reproduced.") This claim to objectivity does not, however, change the nature of the series, which remains "a partisan, propaganda narrative, whose central figure is that of the execution, tirelessly declined."

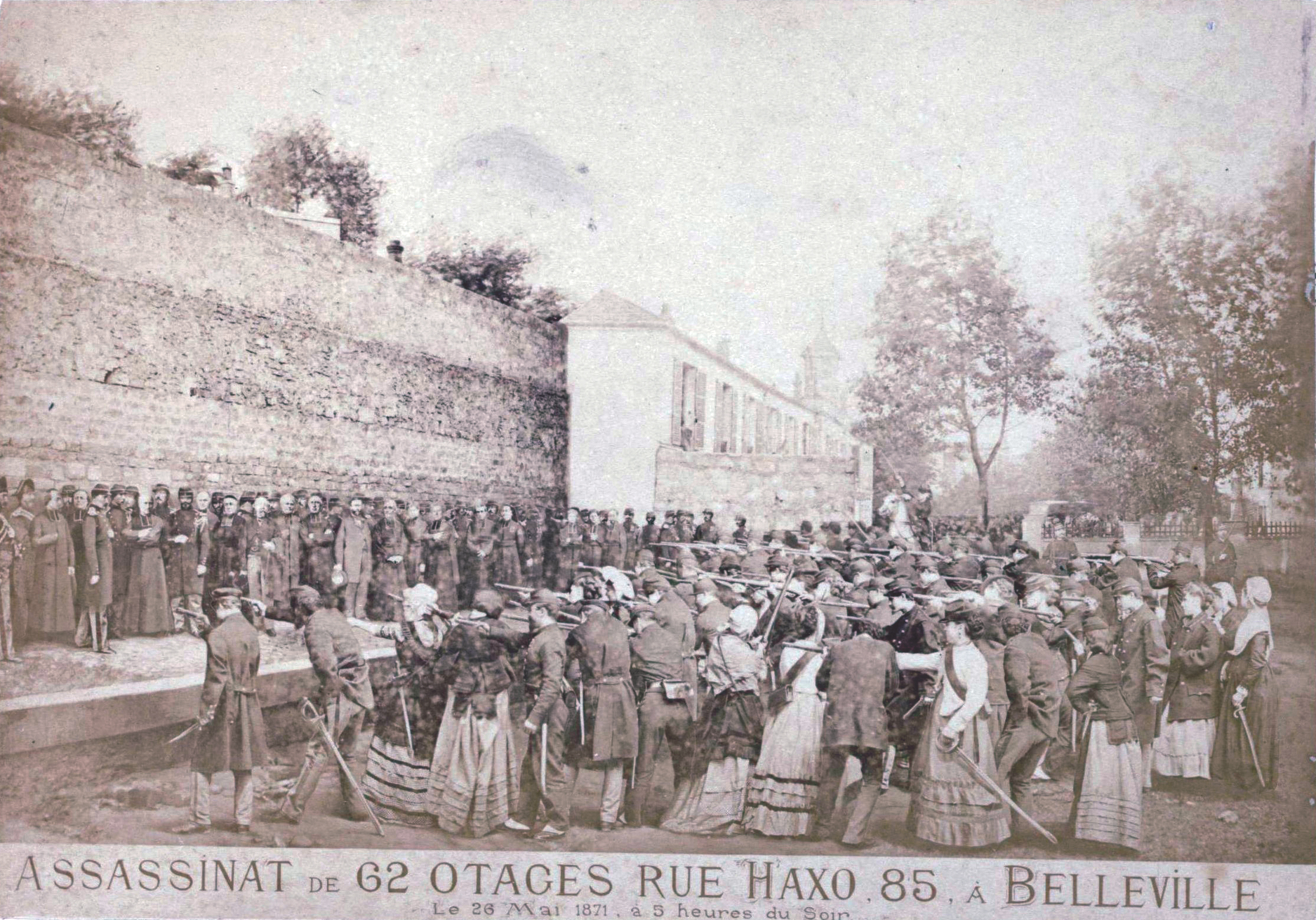
Murder of 62 hostages, rue Haxo 85 in Belleville. May 26, 1871, 5 p.m.

Finally, these photomontages take considerable liberties with historical facts. The execution of the hostages at the Roquette prison was indeed ordered by Théophile Ferré on May 24, 1871, but he was not present at the scene, contrary to what Appert's image suggests. The scene is silent on the confusion of the moment, and the Communards' determination to prevent the execution. The Rue Haxo hostages were not executed all at once, as the photomontage shows, but in small groups, in great confusion. More significantly, Generals Thomas and Lecomte were shot one after the other, summarily and by the angry: Appert's photomontage, itself inspired by an engraving in L'Illustration, gives the impression of a joint execution by an organized platoon, as if implementing a decision of the Paris.

The series succeeded in discrediting the Paris Commune in the long term, since during the centenary of the Paris Commune, West Germany in particular republished the images from Crimes de la Commune without specifying their photomontage status. In 1972 in France, certain editions continued to present "Appert's tricks as authentic documents", and even in 2016, the daily newspaper Ouest-France reused the image of the shooting at the Roquette prison without providing the same information.

=== Photomontage as a search for authenticity ===
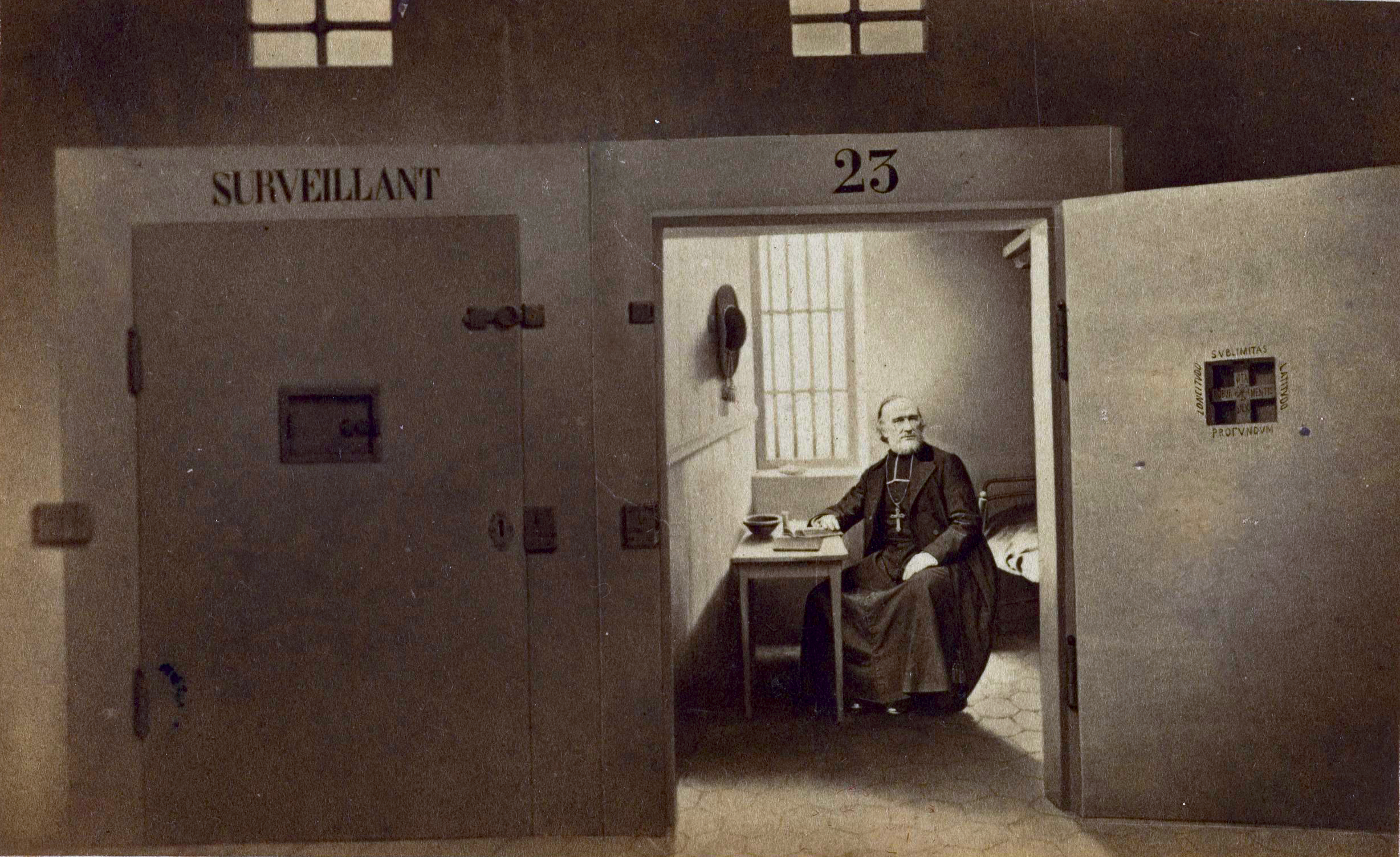
Georges Darboy in his cell at the Roquette prison, photomontage, albumen print, Musée Carnavalet.

For Girardin and Pirker, however, the photomontage reconstruction of the Arcueil Dominicans Massacre reflects a quest for authenticity: the photographer specifies in the caption the date and time of the event the photomontage is intended to reveal. When Appert added portraits of real Communards photographed in Versailles prisons, he was still seeking to "make it real." The photographic image is not mechanically reproducible in the press; rather, it serves as a model for lithographs, which acquire an additional form of authenticity.

For Christine Lapostolle, "before interpreting, for example, the Versailles photomontages in Crimes de la Commune as a scandalous falsification, we need to look at the way photography was perceived in 1871, and determine to what extent this 'deception' of the viewer was not due to a desire to be even more faithful to reality than the technology of the time allowed."

The status of the photographic image, in the eyes of contemporaries, was thus "more than true." Photomontage was a technical response to photography's inability to reveal - exposure times for wet collodion are in excess of two minutes, prohibiting any movement of the subject immediacy. Similarly, Bertrand Tillier points out that "these representations were not conceived as tricks designed to deceive the credulity of the public", since the photographer makes no attempt to conceal the composite origin of his work.

The Crimes de la Commune series bears witness to a particular use of the medium by the Versaillais: instead of depicting themselves, they sought, notably through photomontage, to control the image of the Paris Commune for their time and posterity. With this in mind, the figures are small, no longer easily identifiable – a far cry from the Communard group portrait, a collection of individuals, as in Bruno Braquehais 's series entitled La Chute de la colonne Vendôme – and reduced to a shapeless mass. The essential thing is to bear witness to the crime, to prove it. Appert's entourage believed in the scientific and irrefutable value of photography.

== Copyrights ==
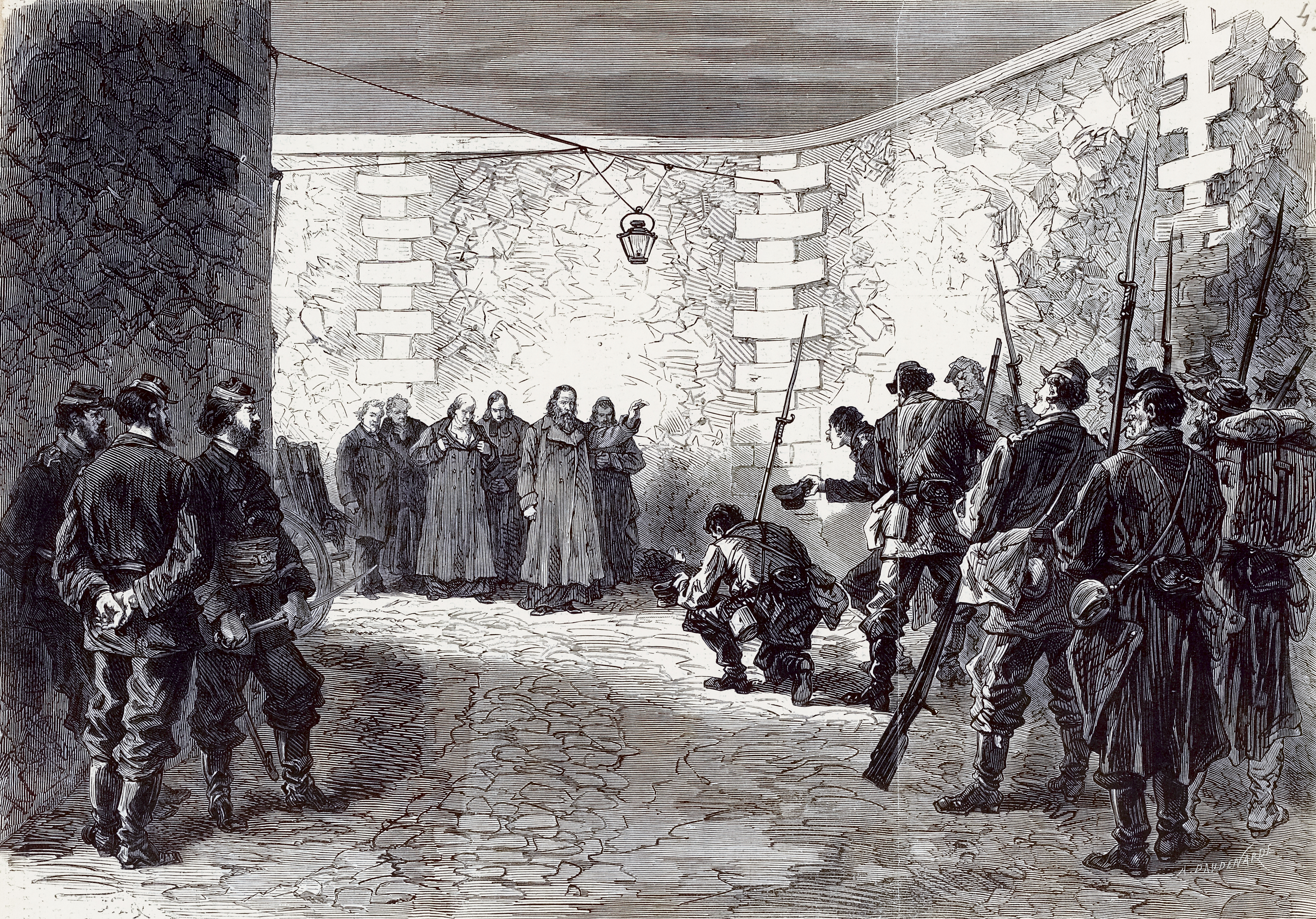
Louis Josée Amédée Daudenarde, Les martyrs, the last moments of ^{Mgr} Darboy and the five victims, Musée Carnavalet.

Appert's photographs also found themselves at the heart of a legal debate over copyright. On October 14, 1871, Le Monde illustré published a series of 50 drawings of communards, 24 of which were copied from Appert's photographs. The newspaper did not mention the authors of the photographs, nor did it pay them. Appert sued Le Monde illustré in 1872, claiming 50,000 francs in damages. However, the Seine Civil Court dismissed his claim, ruling firstly that Appert had obtained an erratum in a later edition of the newspaper, indicating his authorship of the images (following the Courrier de Paris in the October 21, 1871 issue of Le Monde illustré), and that this was all he was asking for at the time, and secondly that publication of the drawings constituted a "useful means of publicity" for the photographer, and not a prejudice.

This trial also provides information on the conditions of collaboration with the Versailles authorities, as well as with the prisoners. According to Appert's lawyer, the Communards whose portraits the photographer took gave him ownership of their image in writing, "demanding in return the delivery of an unlimited number of copies of their photographs, portraits of their comrades" as well as reproductions of "criminal scenes in which they participated". This curious arrangement seems to be borne out by the copies of Appert's photographs in some collections, signed by the prisoners themselves to their relatives or even to their guards. This would have been a way for prisoners to assure their loved ones that they were still alive, at a time of misinformation and increasing executions.

Paradoxically, while the modern technique of photography gives rise here to a conservative message, it can also be recuperated, or even subverted: "Appert's photographs allow relatives to keep alive the flame of the dead. This mobilizing presence of the dead is a central motif of Communard memory". The flourishing trade in photographs depicting Communards worried the authorities as early as June 1871, for they considered that, while the image could, depending on the viewer's sensitivity, stigmatize the subject photographed or, conversely, render him or her heroic, its main effect was to keep alive the memory of the individuals photographed.

== Commerce and posterity ==
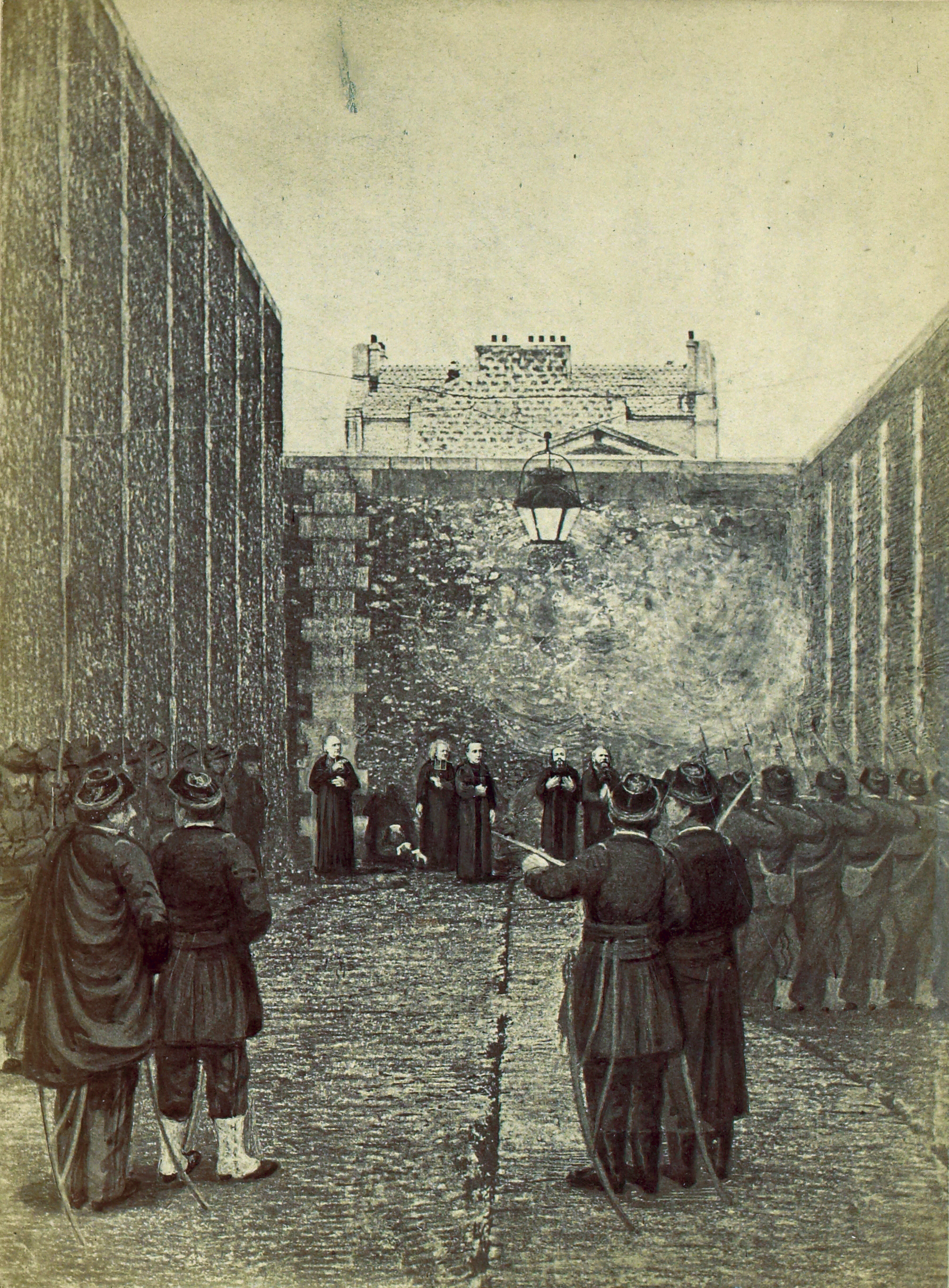
Les Martyrs de la grande Roquette, photomontage by Hippolyte Vauvray, Musée Carnavalet.

Immediately after the Bloody Week and the repression of the Paris Commune, the state had no objection to the trade in images, which enabled it to consolidate its victory over the Communards, to the point that Daniel Salles described Appert as "Thiers's official photographer". The images in Crimes de la Commune were widely distributed, particularly to a popular audience. Several photomontages inspired by, or even differing from, Appert's are registered with the legal deposit office, including Pierre-Hippolyte Vauvray's Martyrs de la Roquette.

However, on December 28, 1871, the distribution of the photographs was banned by decree, on the grounds that they disturbed the public peace and promoted violence. For Daniel Girardin and Christian Pirker, "after playing the propaganda card, the government backed down and exercised censorship. Appert's photomontages are the instruments of these two successive political manipulations". After this date, however, Appert benefited from special privileges, and continued to register works for legal deposit, at least until the circular addressed to police commissioners in November 1872, which clarified and reinforced the previous decree.

In the early 20th century, the photomontages were reproduced in postcard form, in a series entitled Documents historiques, which also included other photographs of the Paris Commune. Since they were not accompanied by any particular mention, it is possible that they were received as evidence of moments taken on the spot.

Copies of the Crimes de la Commune series found their way into auction rooms in the 20th century.

According to Stéphanie Sotteau Soualle and Quentin Bajac, the Crimes de la Commune are "composite images, certainly gimmicks, but whose dramatic aspect reinforces their impact and which, because of their photographic nature, nonetheless retain a superior historical interest".

== See also ==
- Paris Commune
- French-Prussian War
- Photomontage
- Fires at the Paris Commune

== Bibliography ==
- Lhospice, Michel (1965). La guerre de 70 et la Commune en 1 000 images (in French). Paris: Pont Royal. p. 316.
- Freund, Gisèle (1974). Photographie et société. Paris: Éditions du Seuil. p. 220. ISBN 2-02-000660-X.
- Lapostolle, Christine (1988). "Plus vrai que le vrai. Stratégie photographique et Commune de Paris". Actes de la Recherche en Sciences Sociales. 73: 67–76. doi:10.3406/arss.1988.2421.
- Bajac, Quentin (2000). La Commune photographiée : [exposition, Paris, Musée d'Orsay, 14 mars-11 juin 2000]. Réunion des musées nationaux. p. 127. ISBN 2-7118-4007-7.
- M. Przyblyski, Jeannene (2001). "Revolution at a Standstill: Photography and the Paris Commune of 1871". Yale French Studies (101): 54–78. doi:10.2307/3090606. ISSN 0044-0078. JSTOR 3090606.
- Tillier, Bertrand (2004). La Commune de Paris, révolution sans image?: Politique et représentations dans la France républicaine. Editions Champ Vallon. ISBN 978-2-87673-390-9.
- Chéroux, Clément (2004). Les discours de l'origine. À propos du photogramme et du photomontage. ISSN 1270-9050.
- Fournier, Éric. Les photographies des ruines de Paris en 1871 ou les faux-semblants de l'image. ISSN 1265-1354.
- Girardin, Daniel; Pirker, Christian (2008). Controverses: une histoire juridique et éthique de la photographie. Actes Sud. ISBN 978-2-7427-7432-6.
- Milza, Pierre (2009). L'année terrible : La Commune. Perrin. p. 514. ISBN 978-2-262-03073-5.
- Sotteau Soualle, Stéphanie. Appert, photographe parisien (1860-1890): atelier et actualité. pp. 12–16.
- Sotteau Souall, Stéphanie. "Ernest Appert (1831–1890), un précurseur d'Alphonse Bertillon?". Criminocorpus. Revue d'Histoire de la justice, des crimes et des peines. ISSN 2108-6907.
- Fournier, Éric (2018). "La Commune de 1871 : un sphinx face à ses images". Sociétés & Représentations (2): 245–257. doi:10.3917/sr.046.0245.
