= Hellefonna =

Glacier in Svalbard, Norway

- Location within Svalbard
- Type: Glaciated area
- Location: Sabine Land; Spitsbergen, Svalbard
- Coordinates: 78°09′20″N 17°37′30″E

Hellefonna is a glaciated area in Sabine Land at Spitsbergen, Svalbard. It is located between Kjellströmdalen and Sassendalen, and comprises several smaller glaciers, including Jinnbreen, Innerbreen, Marmorbreen, Skruisbreen and Sveigbreen. The area is named after topographer Sigurd Gunnarson Helle.

== See also ==
- List of glaciers in Svalbard
