= Myklegardfjellet =

Mountain in Svalbard, Norway

Coordinates: 78.0661°N 18.7464°E

Myklegardfjellet is a mountain in Sabine Land at Spitsbergen, Svalbard. It is located at the northeastern side of Agardhbukta. The mountain is named after Miklagarðr, the Old Norse name of Constantinople. To the east is Agardhfjellet, separated from Myklegardfjellet by the valley of Morenedalen.
