= Agardhelva =

River of Spitsbergen, Norway

Coordinates: 78°05′28″N 18°18′23″E

Agardhelva is a river forming the border between Sabine Land and Heer Land at Spitsbergen, Svalbard. It flows through the valley of Agardhdalen, from the glaciers Elfenbeinbreen and Sveigbreen, ending into the bay Agardhbukta at the western side of Storfjorden. The river is named after botanist Jacob Georg Agardh.
