= Nordmannsfonna =

Glacier in Svalbard, Norway

Coordinates: 78°16′N 18°25′E

Nordmannsfonna is a glacier in Sabine Land at Spitsbergen, Svalbard Norway. The glacier covers an area of about 250 km^{2}, is located between Sassendalen and Storfjorden, and extends from Jebensfjellet to the north to Roslagenfjellet and Eistraryggen to the south. The glacier consists of a number of sub-glaciers or side glaciers, and drains both westwards to Sassendalen and eastwards to Storfjorden.
