= Agardhdalen =

Valley of Spitsbergen, Norway

Coordinates: 78°05′55″N 18°16′45″E

Agardhdalen is a valley between Sabine Land and Heer Land at Spitsbergen, Svalbard. It forms a continuation of the bay Agardhbukta, at the western side of Storfjorden. The valley is named after botanist Jacob Georg Agardh. The river Agardhelva flows from Sveigbreen and Elfenbeinbreen, through Agardhdalen, with outlet into Agardhbukta.
