= Amélie Mesureur =

French poet and novelist

Amélie Mesureur (née de Wailly; 3 March 1853 – 7 December 1926 in Paris) was a French poet and novelist, best remembered for her Montyon Prize winning novel Histoire d'un enfant de Paris (1870/71). She was made a knight of the Legion of Honour in 1921.
