= Agardhfjellet =

Mountain in Spitsbergen, Norway

- Location within Svalbard

Highest point
- Elevation: 587 m (1,926 ft)
- Coordinates: 78.0751°N 18.8546°E

Geography
- Location: Spitsbergen, Norway

Agardhfjellet is a mountain in Sabine Land at Spitsbergen, Svalbard. It has a height of 587 m.a.s.l., and is located at the western side of Storfjorden, east of Myklegardfjellet. The mountain is named after botanist Jacob Georg Agardh. It also includes the peak Agardhaksla.
