= Charles Rabot =

French explorer (1856–1944)

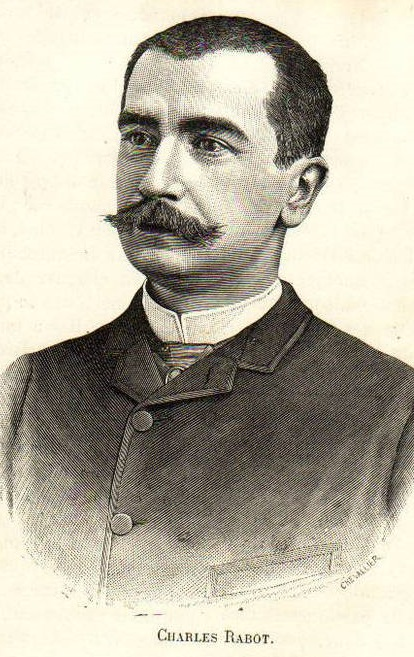
Charles Rabot

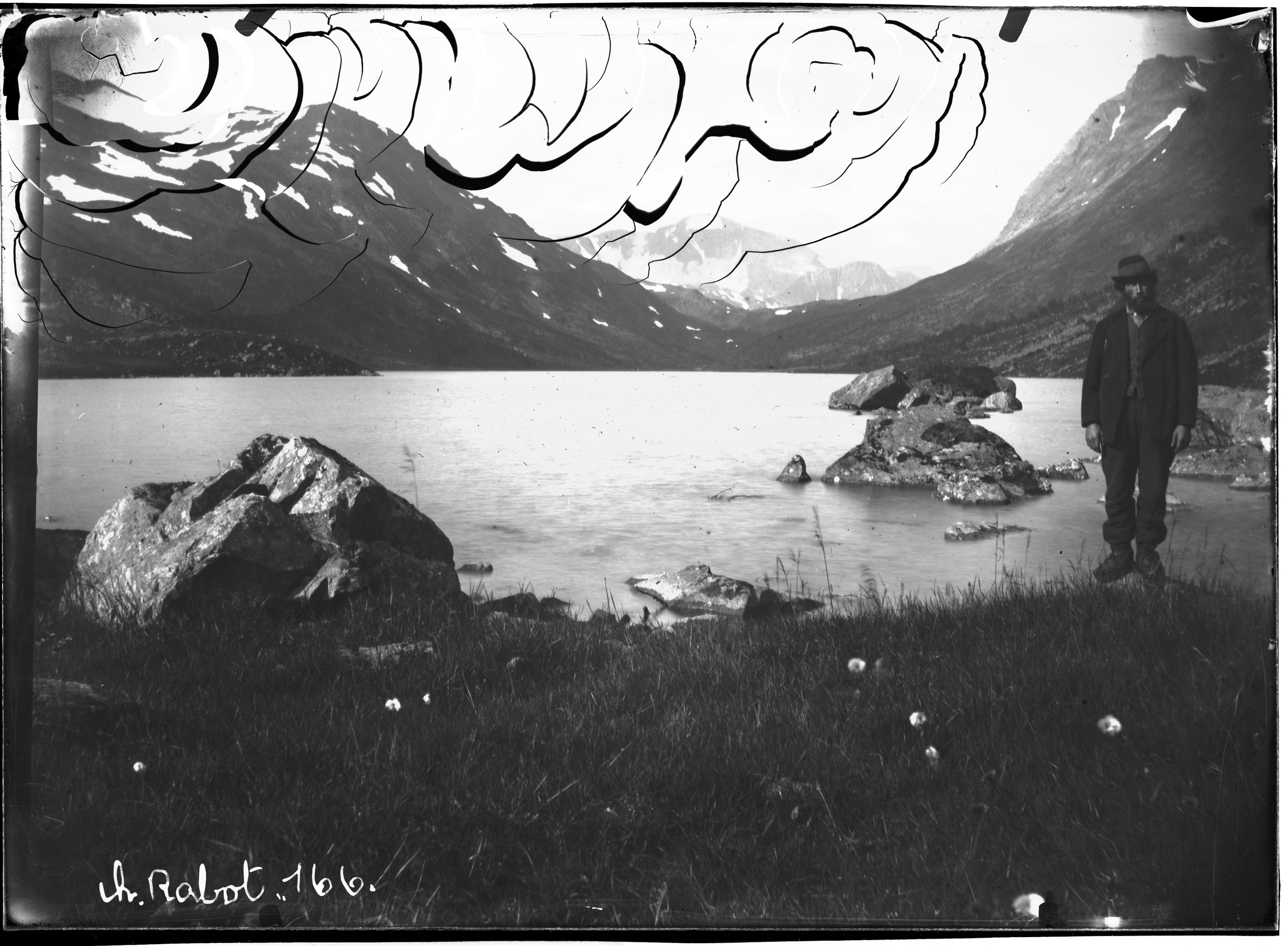
Rabot's photo from Norway

Charles Rabot (26 June 1856 in Nevers − 1 February 1944 in Martigné-Ferchaud) was a French geographer, glaciologist, traveler, journalist, lecturer, translator, and explorer. He was also the first person to climb Kebnekaise, the tallest mountain in Sweden, which he accomplished in 1883.

He led his first expedition to Spitsbergen in 1882 on the ship Petit Paris. Ten years later, he embarked on a voyage on the ship La Mancha, for a mapping mission, redrawing the map of the glacier Svartisen. He crossed Spitsbergen west to east and surveyed Prins Karls Forland.

He was also a passionate ethnographer with the study of some Arctic and Volga peoples to the east and west of the Urals: Chuvash people, Cheremiss, Permiak, Zyrian, Khanty (Ostiaks) and Samoyeds. He published numerous articles on the above subjects, and also wrote and translated many books on Arctic exploration and sciences.

The French base located at Ny-Ålesund bears his name, as has an invertebrate marine plankton found in the waters of Spitsbergen (Eurytemora raboti), and a Swedish as well as a Norwegian glacier. Rabot Island was named after him in 1903−5 by Jean-Baptiste Charcot, leader of the French Antarctic Expedition.

A Norwegian mountain lodge named Rabothytta near the Okstindan glacier has been named after him.

== Articles written ==
"Recent French Explorations in Africa" National Geographic Magazine, Vol. 13 No. 4 (April 1902) pp. 119–132.

== See also ==
- Rabotbreen
