= Agardhbukta =

Bay in Svalbard, Norway

Coordinates: 78°01′48″N 18°31′06″E

Agardhbukta is a bay between Sabine Land and Heer Land at Spitsbergen, Svalbard. It is located at the western side of Storfjorden. It has a length of about 5.5 kilometers and is a continuation of the valley Agardhdalen. The bay is named after botanist Jacob Georg Agardh. The river Agardhelva debouches into the bay. The coastal plain Belemnittsletta is to the east of the bay. Inside of the bay is the inlet Båtbogen.
