= Fimbulisen =

Glacier in Svalbard, Norway

Coordinates: 78.3728°N 17.9193°E

Fimbulisen is a glaciated area in Sabine Land at Spitsbergen, Svalbard. It is located between Von Postbreen and Sassendalen, and covers an area of about 100 km^{2}.
