= Raoul Rigault =

French journalist and revolutionary (1846–1871)

Raol Rigault
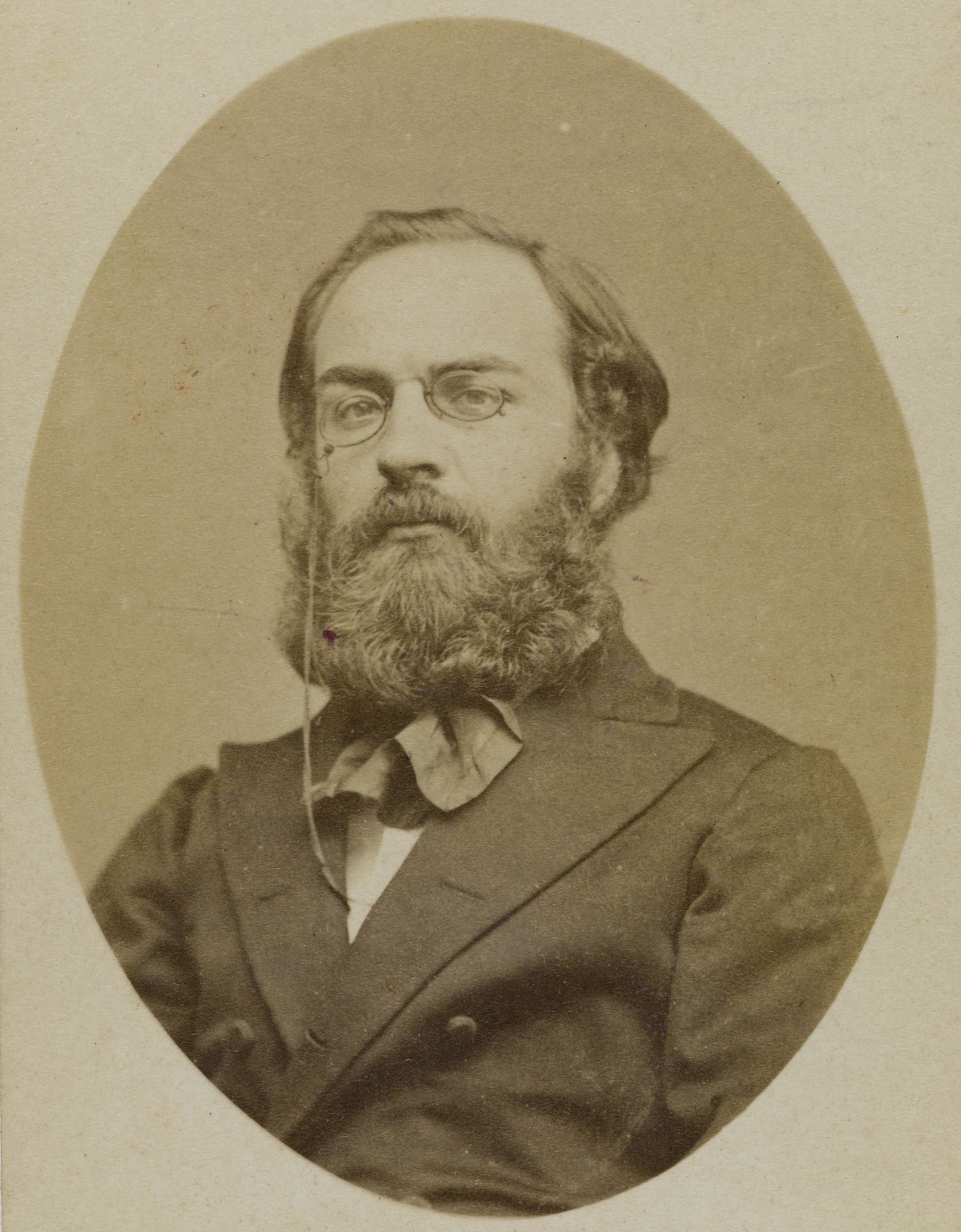
- Rigault, sometime before 1871
- Born: Raoul Adolphe Georges Rigault; 16 January 1846; Paris, Kingdom of France
- Died: 24 May 1871 (aged 25)
- Known for: Involvement in Paris Commune

Raoul Adolphe Georges Rigault (16 January 1846 - 24 May 1871) was a journalist and French socialist revolutionary, best known for his role during the Paris Commune of 1871.

He is most notable for his execution of Archbishop Darboy, as well as for having saved the life of the French artist Pierre-Auguste Renoir from a firing squad; for having led a ruthless, Jacobin-style police operation during the Paris Commune; and for his unrelenting hatred of religion.

== Personal life ==
=== Upbringing ===
Rigault was the son of a councillor at the Seine prefecture and attended École polytechnique.

=== Character ===
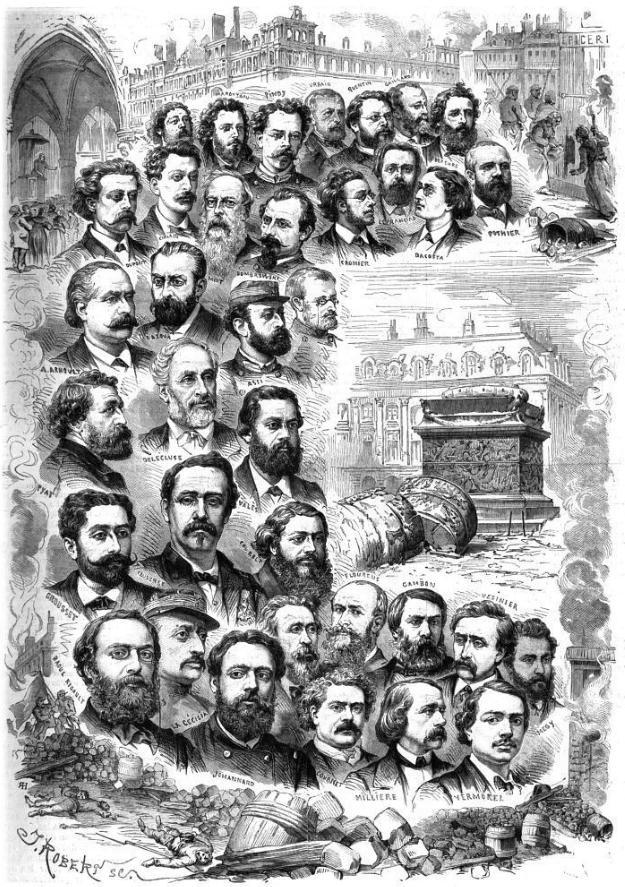
Raoul Rigault (Bottom-Most, Left-Most), "Les hommes de la Commune," ("The Men of the Commune,") L'Illustration, journal universel, 15 juillet 1871, unknown artist.

The New York Times in 1884 gives the following description of Rigault...

...fond of good wine, always talking, shouting, gesticulating, filling his nose with snuff, astonishing the novices with his gift of speech, almost celebrated in the Quartier des Ecoles, and much appreciated by girls of low condition.

According to the Association des Amies et Amis de la Commune de Paris 1871 (Association of Friends and Friends of the 1871 Paris Commune), Rigault was hated for being a "swagger of perversity", "scoundrel", "aristocrat of the thuggery", for making jokes about how he had improved the guillotine, for his "militant atheism," and for creating a police system of "informants and snitches."

== As revolutionary ==
Rigault had been a revolutionary since his youth. In 1866, he was arrested at a meeting of revolutionaries at the Café de la Renaissance in Saint-Michel, and in 1868, he served three months imprisonment for publishing a journal on Atheism.

Rigault's revolutionary activity was anti-police and anti-establishment. He had "spent long hours with a spyglass propped up on a Seine bookseller's stall, peering into the Prefecture of Police across the water," and with this information, he kept "track of the coming and going of informers and plain-clothes men," and also managed the "undoing of a particularly harsh and licentious judge, Delesvaux, who delighted in sentencing revolutionaries."

=== Meeting with Renoir ===
While a fugitive in youth, he was hidden by Pierre-Auguste Renoir, the famous painter, in the forests of Fontainebleau. He would return the favor by noticing Renoir destined for the firing squad in the Paris Commune, and having Renoir immediately pardoned and released.

== As Chief of Police ==
=== General procedures ===
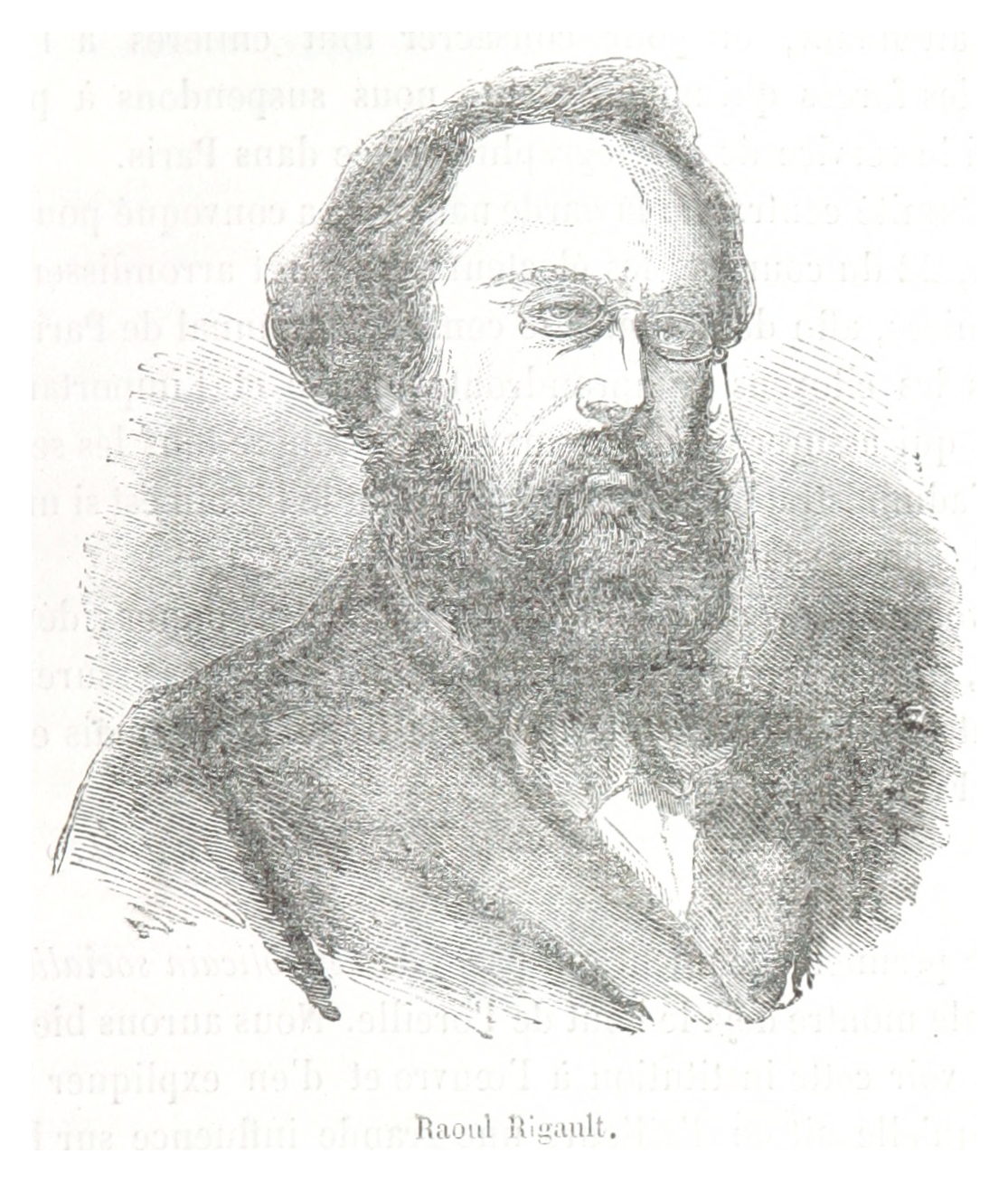
Raoul Rigault Drawing, by Jules Rouquette

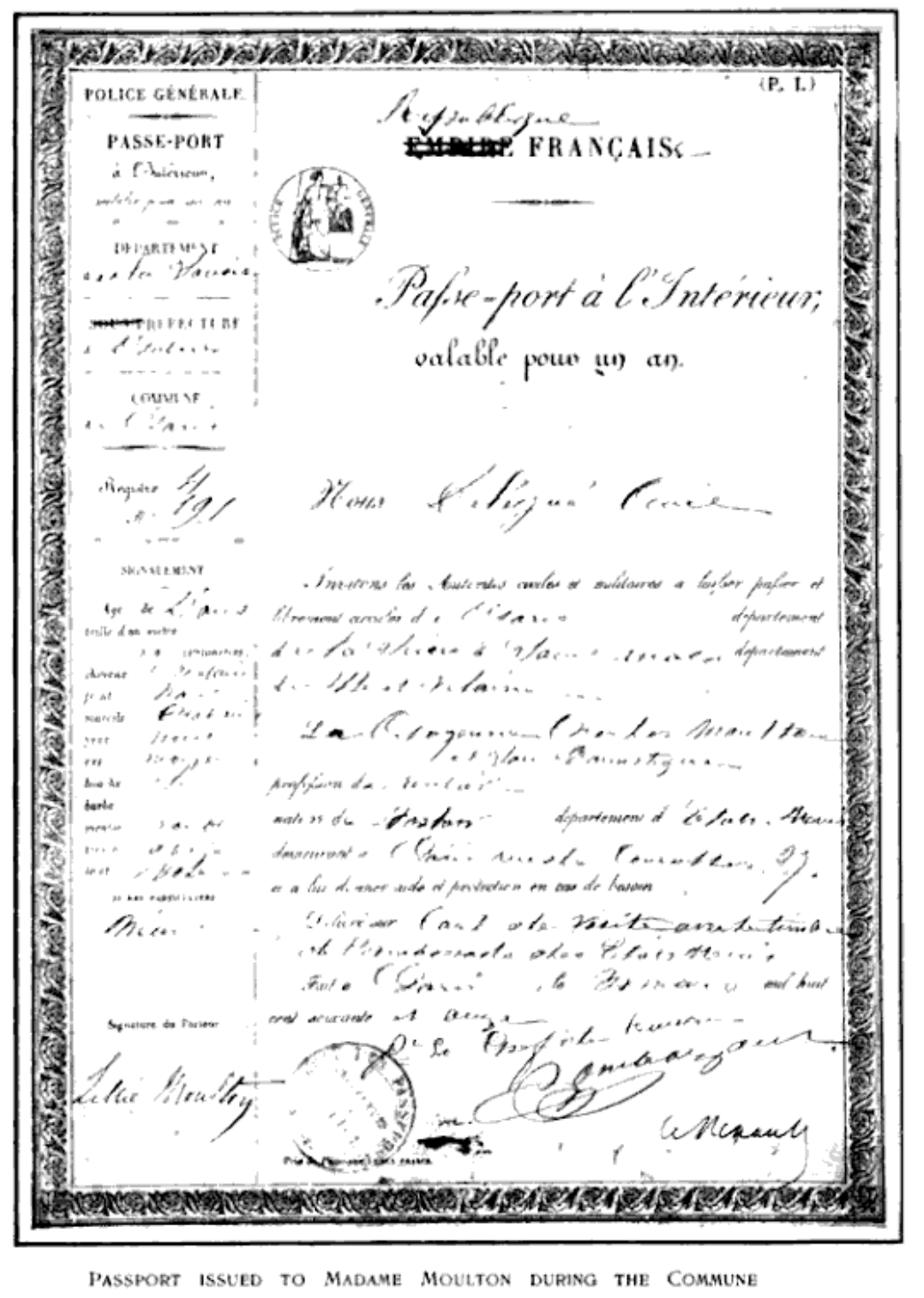
Passport signed by Raoul Rigault for Madame de Hegermann-Lindencrone.

While the majority of the Commune's politicians were extremely progressive and far-left wing, The New Yorker describes Rigault as "the backward-looking aspect... A socialist polemicist of appetite and charm, he became, in effect, the head of the Commune's police force."

One American woman, Madame de Hegermann-Lindencrone, held audience with Rigault as Chief of Police, and described his quarters as barren of furniture, "only the table...[and] two or three plain chairs... Just such a chamber as Robespierre might have occupied during his republic," claiming that Rigault "took advantage of the unavoidable questions that belong to the making out of a passport."

=== Freeing of prisoners ===
His most popular acts as police chief were those in the beginning, when he freed those imprisoned by the imperial French government, which included revolutionaries, Anarchists, and Blanquists.

=== Blanquist obsession ===
As police chief, the main occupation that Rigault worried himself with was with freeing Louis Auguste Blanqui, then being held by the monarchist forces of Versailles. His plan was to do a hostage trade of Archbishop Georges Darboy in exchange for Blanqui; but when this plan tragically failed, Darboy was executed by Commune forces in a stir of panic and desperation, killing one of the most reform-minded and democratically oriented bishops of France.

=== Anti-catholicism and anti-religion ===
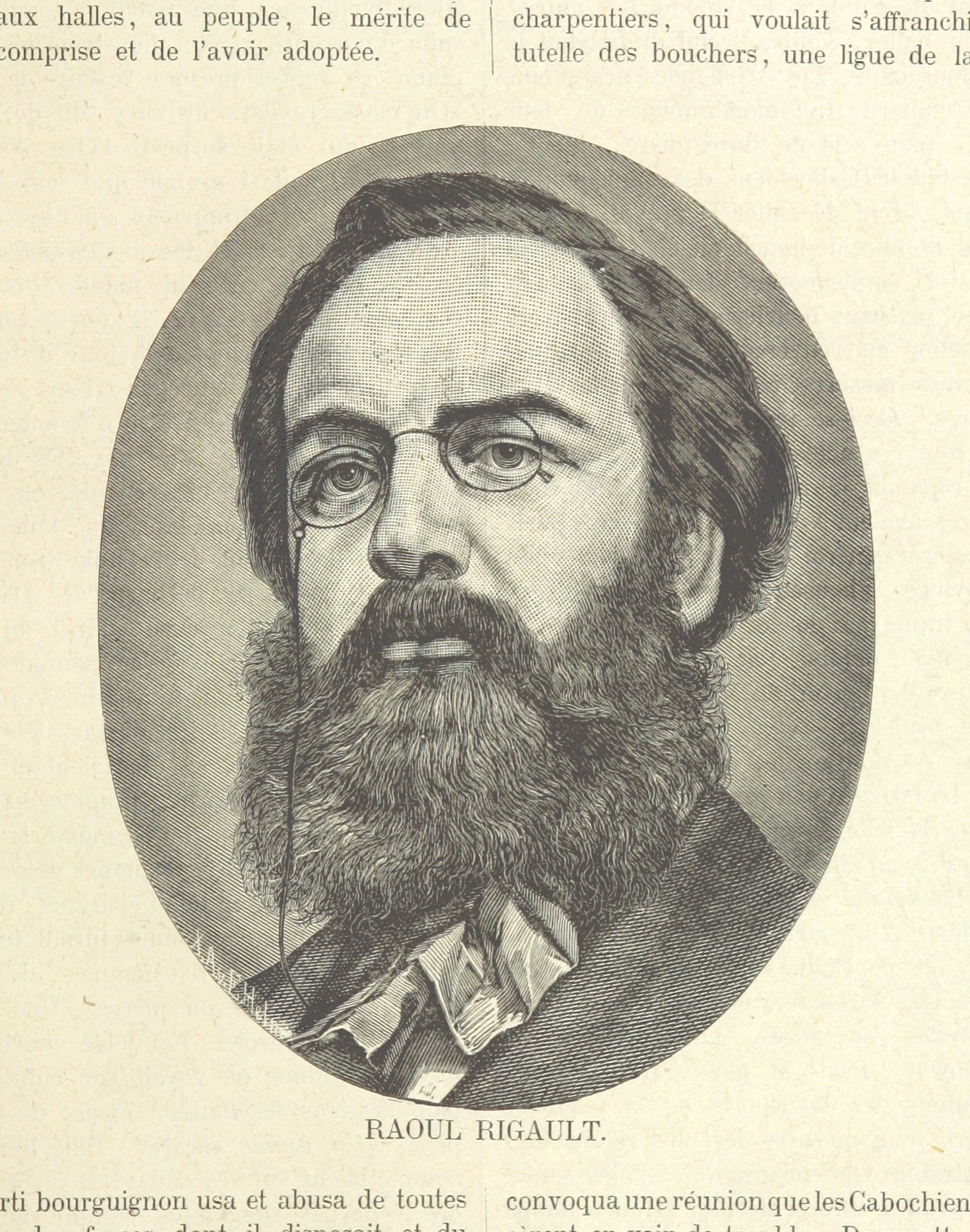
Raoul Rigault Drawing, by H.D. Justesse

If there was one issue over which the Communards instinctively and almost unanimously sympathized with Rigault, "this was his violent anticlericalism," according to the historian, Alistair Horne. As chief of police, he searched and investigated churches for evidence of sympathy with Versailles (as with most forms of Revolution in Western Europe, this evidence meant any hidden arms). The arrest of Archbishop Darboy was done at the hand of Rigault. The following famous dialogue took place between a Jesuit and Rigault...

Rigualt: What is your profession?

Priest: Servant of God.

Rigault: Where does your master live?

Priest: Everywhere.

Rigault (to Clerk): Take this down: X, describing himself servant of one called God, a vagrant.

One historian of the Paris Commune wrote that, "Atheism was a cardinal tenet of Blanqui's faith, and his disciple Rigault was an adept at priest-baiting."

== Death ==
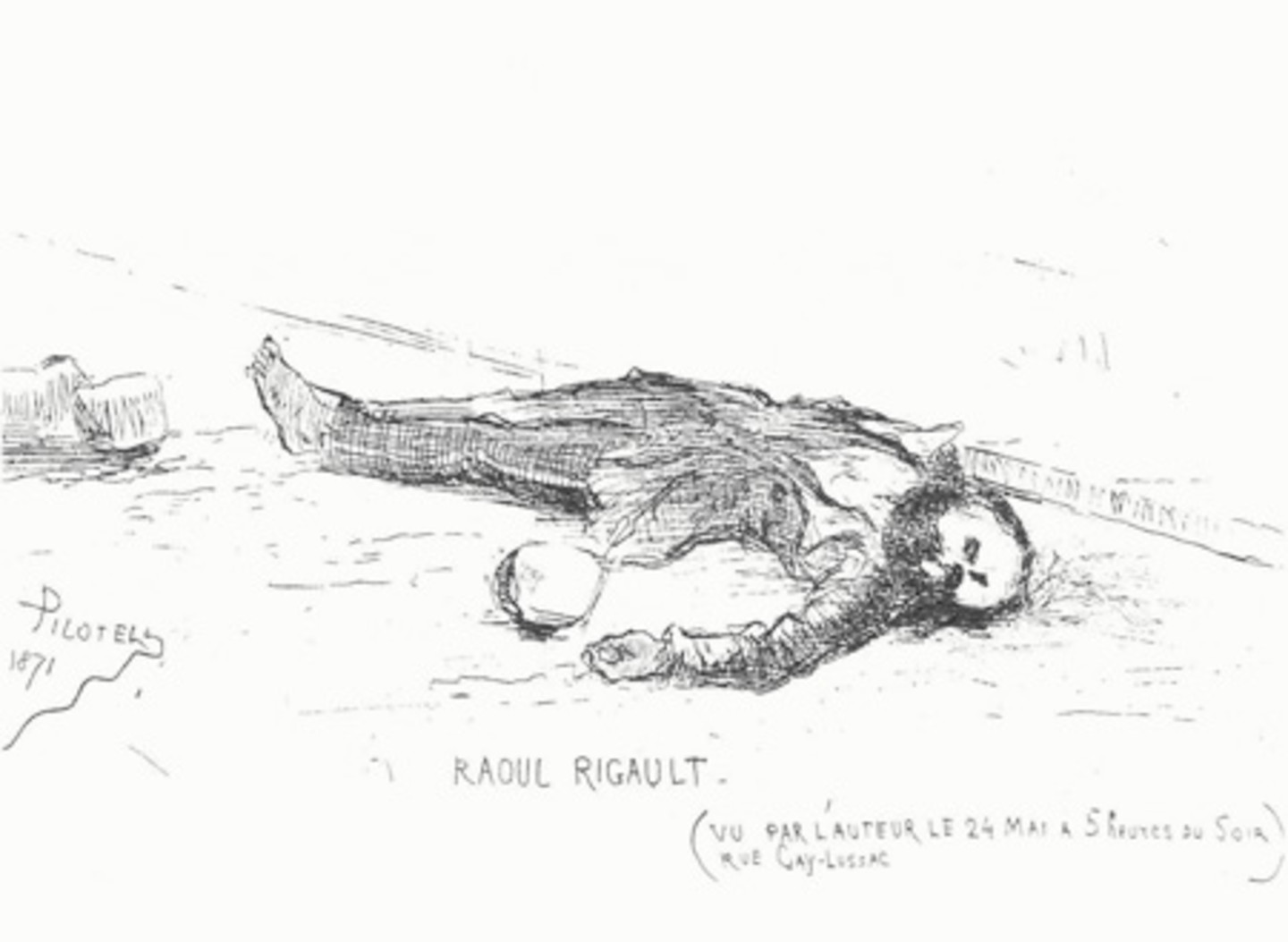
Execution of Raoul Rigault, drawing by Georges Pilotell

After the Paris Commune, he was "simply executed with a bullet in the skull, on the street of Gay-Lussac on Wednesday, May 24, 1871." According to a more detailed account, Rigault had worn his National Guard uniform that day, in order to shame those who refused to keep up the fight. In this outfit, he was instantly picked up. At gunpoint by a Versailles officer, he was ordered to shout, "Long Live Versailles!" He responded, "You are assassins! Long live the Commune!" and was immediately shot.

== See also ==
- Paris Commune
- Louis Charles Delescluze
- Louis Auguste Blanqui
