= Sassendalen =

Valley of Spitsbergen, Norway

Coordinates: 78°16′N 17°06′E

Sassendalen is a valley at Spitsbergen, Svalbard. The valley is among the largest valleys of Svalbard, and continues westwards into Sassenfjorden. Part of the valley divides Sabine Land and Nordenskiöld Land. The river Sassenelva runs through the valley.
