= Sabine Land =

Land area in Spitsbergen, Svalbard, Norway

Coordinates: 78°16′50″N 18°11′40″E

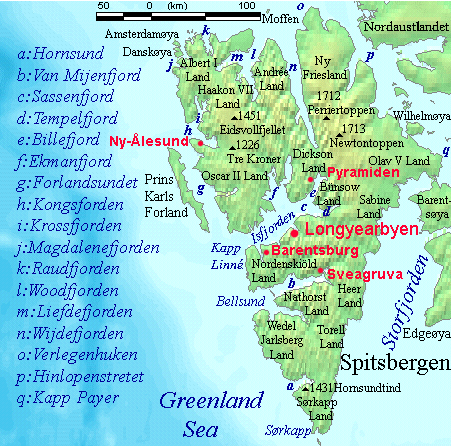
Sabine Land is located on the eastern side of Spitsbergen.

Sabine Land (/ˈseɪbɪn/ SAY-bin) is a land area on the east coast of Spitsbergen, Svalbard. It is named after explorer General Sir Edward Sabine. Among the glaciers in the area is the 250-square-kilometer (97 sq mi) Nordmannsfonna glacier.
