= Reinhalvøya =

Peninsula in Svalbard, Norway

Coordinates: 80.2098°N 21.2491°E

Reinhalvøya is a peninsula in Gustav V Land, at the northern coast of Nordaustlandet, Svalbard. It is located within the large bay Nordenskiöldbukta, south of Scoresbyøya and the Sabine Islands, and separates the bay of Sabinebukta from the bay Carolusbukta.
