= Rijpdalen =

Valley of Svalbard, Norway

Coordinates: 79.9192°N 22.2519°E

Rijpdalen is a valley in the central part of Nordaustlandet, Svalbard, separating Gustav V Land from Prins Oscars Land. The valley extends between the head of Wahlenbergfjorden and the head of Rijpfjorden. The valley is named after Dutch explorer Jan Rijp. At the watershed in Rijpdalen is the plain of Helvetesflya. The ice caps of Vestfonna and Austfonna are separated by Rijpdalen and Helvetesflya.
