= Nordaust-Svalbard Nature Reserve =

Nature reserve in Svalbard, Norway

- IUCN category Ia (strict nature reserve)
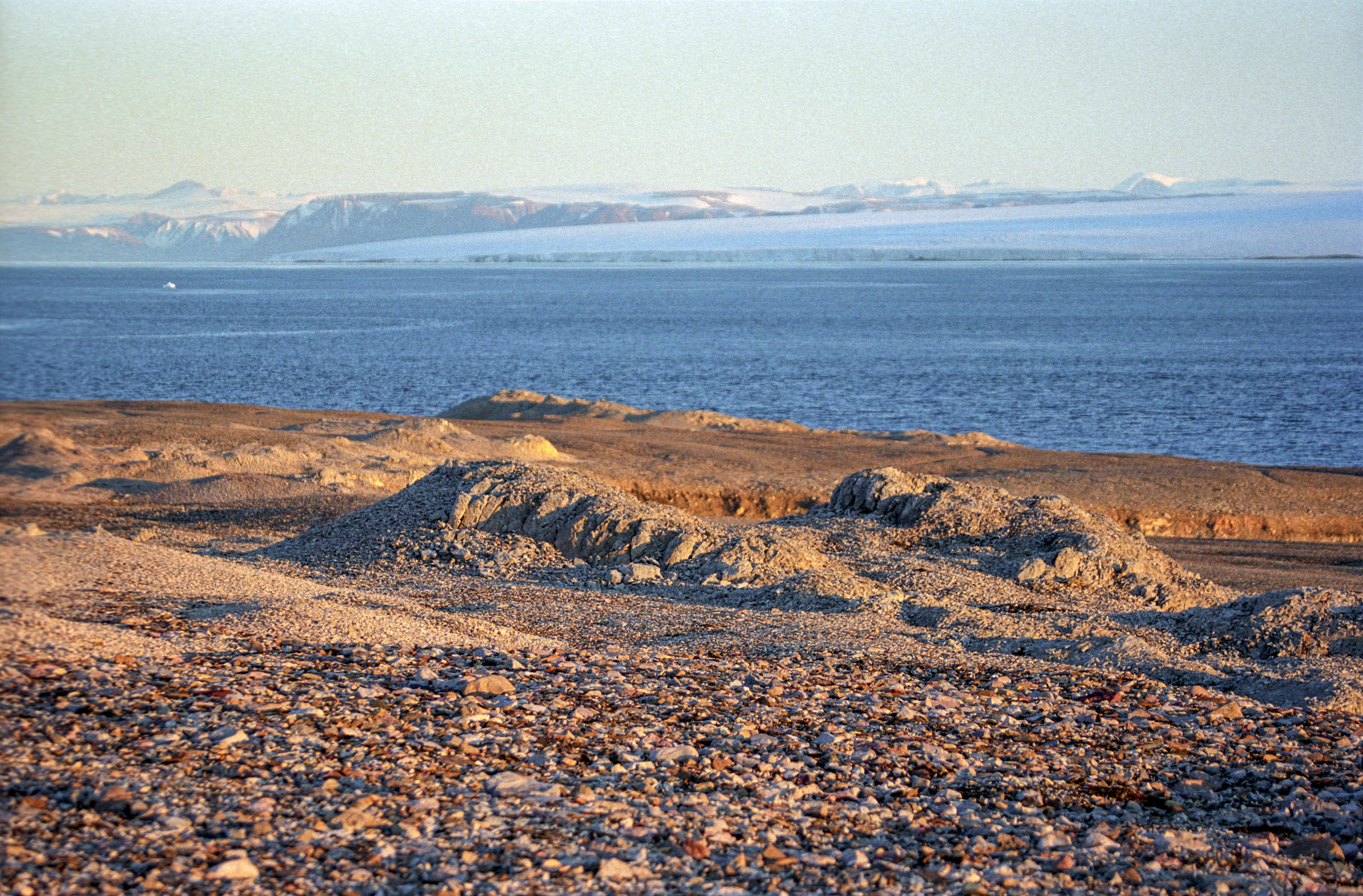
- Hinlopen Strait seen from Nordaustlandet

- Location: Svalbard, Norway
- Nearest city: Longyearbyen
- Coordinates: 79°N 23°E
- Area: 55,354 km^{2} (21,372 sq mi), of which 18,663 km^{2} (7,206 sq mi) is land 36,691 km^{2} (14,166 sq mi) is water
- Established: 1 July 1973
- Governing body: Norwegian Environment Agency

Nordaust-Svalbard Nature Reserve (Norwegian: Nordaust-Svalbard naturreservat) is located in the north-eastern part of the Svalbard archipelago in Norway. The nature reserve covers all of Nordaustlandet, Kong Karls Land, Kvitøya, Sjuøyane, Storøya, Lågøya, Wilhelm Island, Wahlbergøya and a small section of the north-east corner of Spitsbergen. The reserve is 55,354 square kilometres (21,372 sq mi), of which 18,663 square kilometres (7,206 sq mi) is on land and 36,691 square kilometres (14,166 sq mi) is on water—making it the largest preserved area in Norway (including national parks). It includes the largest glacier in Norway, Austfonna, as well as Vestfonna and parts of Olav V Land. The reserve has been protected since 1 July 1973 and borders in the south to Søraust-Svalbard Nature Reserve.

== Description ==
Three-quarters of Nordaustlandet is covered by glaciers, the largest being Austfonna at 7,000 square kilometres (2,700 sq mi). The landscape has low, rounded hills and plains, created by glaciation during former ice ages. Most of the reserve has little or no vegetation, and the reserve belongs to the polar desert. The nature reserve is used by scientists and tourists, the latter commonly sailing eastwards along Hinlopen Strait or round Nordaustlandet. The most popular places to visit are Sjuøyane, Alkefjellet, Bråsvellbreen and Kvitøya.

There are some cultural heritage sites within the reserve, including a Russian Orthodox cross on Krossøya, and Andréeneset on Kvitøya, the starting point for the S. A. Andrée's Arctic balloon expedition of 1897. There is also a winter camp at the shores of Sorgfjorden, which hosted an 1899–1900 Swedish-Russian Arc-of-Meridian Expedition to measure the meridian arc. In Rijpfjorden there is a German meteorological station from World War II.

== Fauna ==
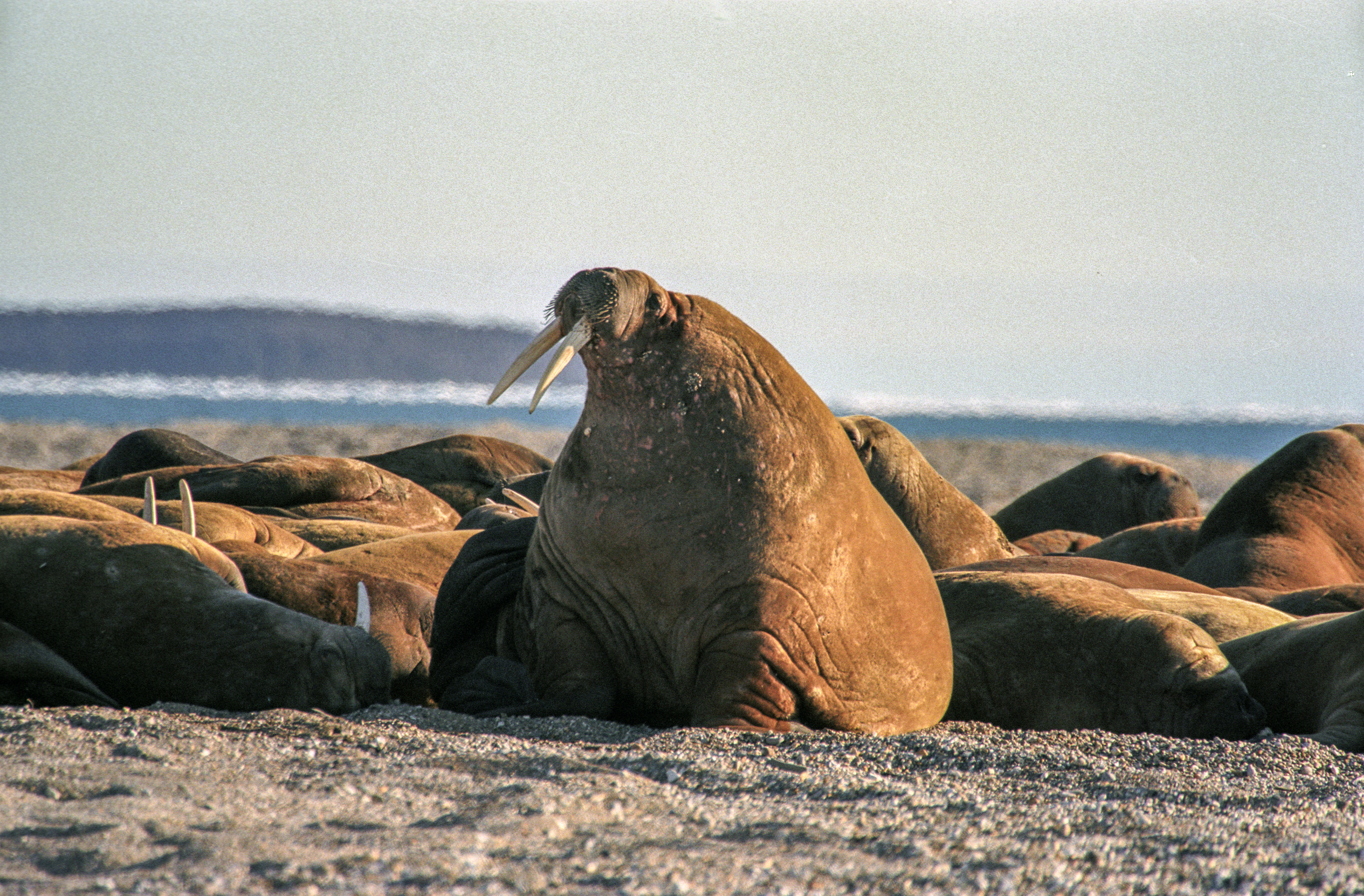
Walrus colony on Nordaustlandet

The Kong Karls Land archipelago serves as the most important breeding ground for polar bears in Svalbard and Franz Josef Land; therefore, the archipelago is completely off limit to all visitors. Walruses have resting places in the reserve. At Alkefjleet, Brünnich's guillemots have a nesting ground, and also brent geese can be found breeding in the reserve, as can Sabine's and ivory gulls. Other important breeding areas for seabirds include Sjuøyane, Lågøya and Hinlopen Strait. Common animals within the nature reserve is Arctic fox and Svalbard reindeer. A large part of the reserve, including the sea-cliffs, has been identified as an Important Bird Area (IBA) by BirdLife International because it supports a breeding population of 80–90 pairs of ivory gulls.
