= Rosenthalbreen =

Glacier in Svalbard, Norway

Coordinates: 79.3856°N 21.4493°E

Rosenthalbreen is a glacier in Gustav Adolf Land in Nordaustlandet, Svalbard, Norway. It is named after German shipowner and expedition organizer Friedrich Wilhelm Albert Rosenthal. The glacier is an outlet from Vegafonna. It borders to the coastal plain of Svartknausflya, and drains into the sea east of Torellneset, into the bay Ulvebukta of Hinlopen Strait.
