= Brageneset =

Island in Svalbard, Norway

Geography
- Location: Wahlenbergfjorden
- Coordinates: 79.7°N 18.8°E
- Area: 10 km^{2} (3.9 sq mi)
- Highest point: 52 m

Administration
- Norway

Demographics
- Population: 0

Brageneset is an island at Nordaustlandet, Svalbard, at the mouth of Wahlenbergfjorden. The ice cap Vestfonna has a glacier arm known as Bragebreen, which debouches east of Brageneset, and another glacier arm, Gimlebreen, debouches into Hinlopen Strait to the north of Brageneset.

Until the summer of 2019, Brageneset was believed to be a headland. However, when the ice cap retreated, it was revealed that it is, in fact, an island.
