= Palanderisen =

Glacier at Nordaustlandet, Svalbard, Norway

Coordinates: 79.5683°N 21.8541°E

Palanderisen is a glaciated area in Gustav Adolf Land at Nordaustlandet, Svalbard. It has an extension of about 35 kilometers and is part of the ice cap of Austfonna, located west of the Sørdomen ice dome, between Etonbreen and Ericadalen. The area is named after Arctic explorer Louis Palander. It includes Sørfonna.
