= Nordporten =

Strait in Svalbard, Norway

Coordinates: 80.0283°N 17.5702°E

Nordporten (North Gate) is the northern part of Hinlopen Strait, Svalbard. It extends from a northern line between Langgrunnodden and Verlegenhuken, to a southern line between the headlands of Tvillingneset and Basisodden. Nordporten has a width of about fifteen nautical miles at the mouth between Storsteinhalvøya and Mosselhalvøya. Further south it narrows to about five nautical miles.
