= Pentavika =

Bay of Svalbard

Coordinates: 80.1810°N 18.2357°E

Pentavika is a cove that is located at the northern side of Storsteinhalvøya in Gustav V Land at Nordaustlandet, Svalbard. The cove is located west of Westmanbukta, at the western entrance of Franklinsundet.
