= Depotodden =

Headland of Nordaustlandet, Svalbard

Coordinates: 80.3859°N 19.4758°E

Depotodden is a headland in Gustav V Land at Nordaustlandet, Svalbard. It is located south of the mountain of Basisfjellet on the peninsula Laponiahalvøya, at the northeastern side of Brennevinsfjorden.
