= Nyströmøya =

Island in Svalbard, Norway

Coordinates: 79.430°N 19.544°E

Nyströmøya is an island in Hinlopen Strait between Spitsbergen and Nordaustlandet, Svalbard. The island belongs to Vaigattøyane, and is located north of Wahlbergøya. The island is named after Swedish physician and politician Carl Nyström. The highest point is 49 m.a.s.l. Total area of the island, about 7 km^{2}.
