= Basisfjellet =

Mountain in Svalbard, Norway

Coordinates: 80.3968°N 19.5100°E

Basisfjellet is a mountain in Gustav V Land at Nordaustlandet, Svalbard. It has a height of 460 m.a.s.l. and is located on the peninsula Laponiahalvøya, at the northeastern side of Brennevinsfjorden.
