= Franzøya =

Island in Svalbard, Norway

Coordinates: 79.2938°N 21.1120°E

Franzøya is an island in Hinlopen Strait, south of Nordaustlandet, Svalbard. It is located south of Karl Alexanderøya, southeast of Torellneset. The island is named after Frederick Francis II, Grand Duke of Mecklenburg-Schwerin. At the southern side of the island is the bay Pücklerhamna.
