= Langgrunnodden =

Headland of Nordaustlandet, Svalbard

Coordinates: 80.1282°N 17.7469°E

Langgrunnodden (The Shoal Point) is a headland in Gustav V Land at Nordaustlandet, Svalbard. It is the westernmost point of the peninsula Storsteinhalvøya, and also the westernmost point of Nordaustlandet. The point marks the eastern side of the northern entrance to Hinlopen Strait.
