= Kapp Lovén =

Headland of Nordaustlandet, Svalbard

Coordinates: 80.2688°N 21.7600°E

Kapp Lovén is a headland in Gustav V Land at Nordaustlandet, Svalbard. It is located at the eastern side of Planciusbukta and west of Rijpfjorden, north of the mountain Båtkvelvet. The headland is named after Swedish zoologist Sven Ludvig Lovén.
