= Svartknausflya =

Plain in Svalbard

Coordinates: 79.3965°N 22.0715°E

Svartknausflya is a coastal plain in Gustav Adolf Land in Nordaustlandet, Svalbard. The length of the plain is about 21 kilometers. West of the plain is Rosenthalbreen, and to the east is Vibebukta and Bråsvellbreen.
