= Selanderneset =

Headland of Nordaustlandet, Svalbard

Coordinates: 79.6072°N 19.6602°E

Selanderneset is a headland in Gustav Adolf Land at Nordaustlandet, Svalbard. It is located south of Gyldénøyane, at the southern side of the mouth of Wahlenbergfjorden. The headland is named after Swedish astronomer Nils Haquin Selander.
