= Rijpbreen =

Glacier in Gustav V Land at the northern side of Nordaustlandet, Svalbard

Coordinates: 80.1030°N 21.5724°E

Rijpbreen is a glacier in Gustav V Land at the northern side of Nordaustlandet, Svalbard. The glacier debouches into Bengtssenbukta, a western branch of Rijpfjorden. The glacier is named after Dutch explorer Jan Rijp.
