= Palanderbukta =

Bay of Svalbard

Coordinates: 79.5889°N 20.6589°E

Palanderbukta is a fjord or bay in Gustav Adolf Land at Nordaustlandet, Svalbard, a southern bay of Wahlenbergfjorden. The bay is named after Swedish naval officer Louis Palander.

Palanderbukta has a length of about twelve nautical miles. Southwest of the bay is the peninsula Scaniahalvøya, with the ice caps Glitnefonna and Vegafonna.
