= Glitnefonna =

Ice cap in Gustav Adolf Land on Nordaustlandet in the Svalbard archipelago

Coordinates: 79.5307°N 20.2119°E

Glitnefonna is an ice cap in Gustav Adolf Land on Nordaustlandet in the Svalbard archipelago. It is located on the peninsula Scaniahalvøya, west of the glacier Vegafonna, between the bay Palanderbukta to the northeast and Hinlopen Strait to the southwest. The glacier is named after the god hall Glitnir from Norse mythology.
