= Von Otterøya =

Island in Svalbard, Norway

Coordinates: 79.2650°N 20.0082°E

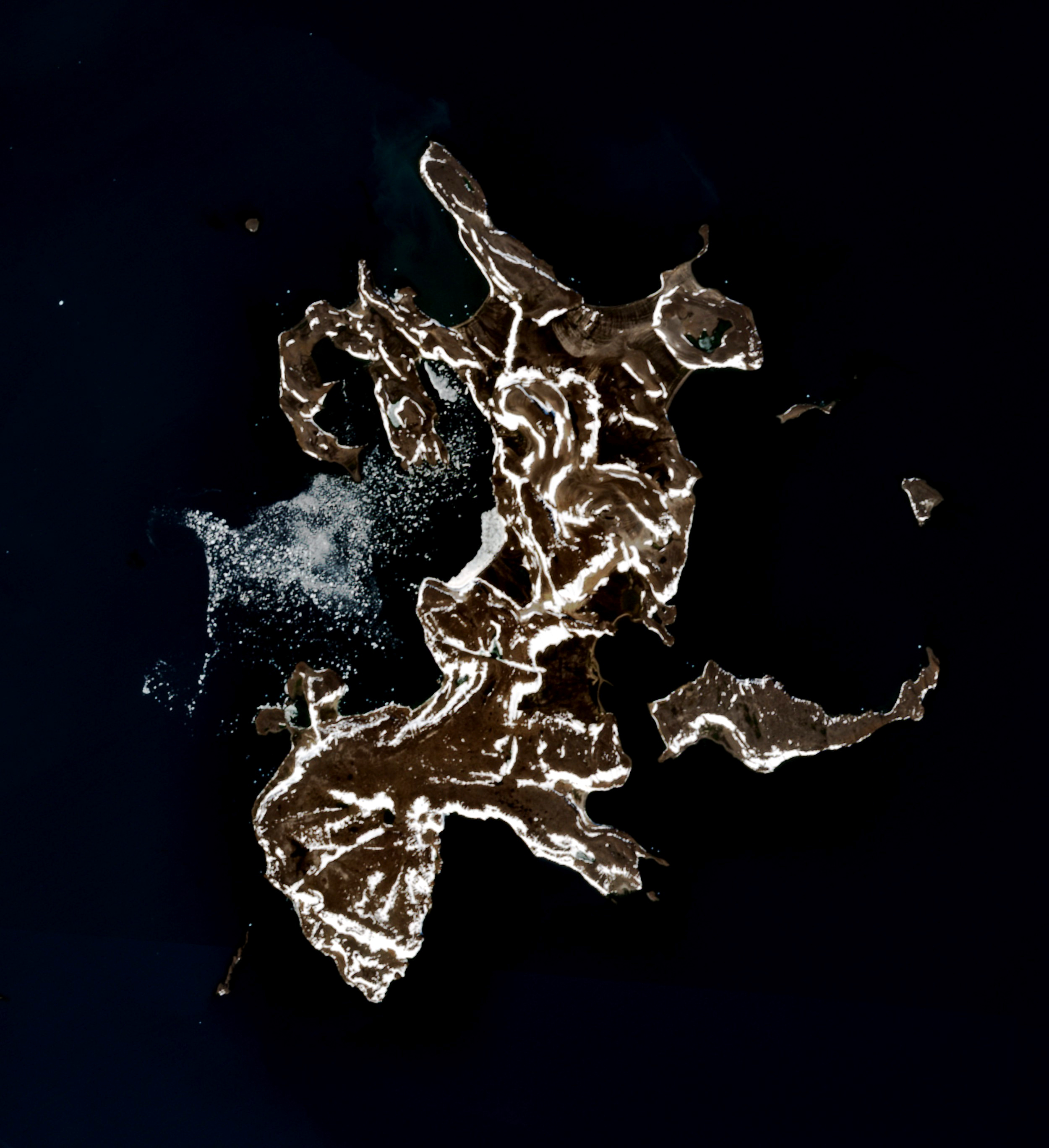
Sentinel-2 image (2021)

Von Otterøya is an island in Hinlopen Strait between Spitsbergen and Nordaustlandet, Svalbard. The island belongs to Vaigattøyane, and is located south of Wahlbergøya. The highest point is 76 m.a.s.l. Total area of the island, about 20 km^{2}.

The island is named after Swedish naval officer, baron and politician Fredrik von Otter.
