= Oxfordelva =

Location
- Country: Norway
- Archipelago: Svalbard
- Island: Nordaustlandet

Physical characteristics
- Source: Brånevatnet
- Mouth: Bodleybukta, Wahlenbergfjorden
  - coordinates: 79°48′31″N 21°40′00″E

Oxfordelva ("Oxford river") is a river at Nordaustlandet, Svalbard. The river flows from the lake of Brånevatnet through the peninsula of Oxfordhalvøya, and debouches into Bodleybukta, a bay in Wahlenbergfjorden. The river is named after Oxfordhalvøya (the Oxford Peninsula), which was named by George Binney, leader of the Merton College Arctic Expedition of 1923 and the Oxford University Arctic Expedition of 1924.
