= Båtkvelvet =

Mountain in Svalbard

Coordinates: 80.2392°N 21.7748°E

Båtkvelvet is a mountain in Gustav V Land at Nordaustlandet, Svalbard. It has a height of 343 m.a.s.l. and is located east of the bay Planciusbukta and west of Rijpfjorden. To the north the mountain ends at Kapp Lovén. The eastern side of the mountain falls steeply into the sea.
