= Scaniahalvøya =

Peninsula in Svalbard, Norway

Coordinates: 79.4933°N 20.6435°E

Scaniahalvøya is a peninsula in Gustav Adolf Land on Nordaustlandet, Svalbard. It is located south of Wahlenbergfjorden and the bay Palanderbukta, and northeast of Hinlopen Strait. The peninsula is named after the Swedish province of Scania. Large parts of Scaniahlavøya are glaciated, with the two icecaps Vegafonna and Glitnefonna.
