= Bragebreen =

Glacier in Svalbard

Coordinates: 79.7717°N 19.2839°E

Bragebreen is a glacier at Nordaustlandet, Svalbard. It is located at the mouth of Wahlenbergfjorden between the headlands of Brageneset and Idunneset. Bragebreen is a glacier stream from the large icecap Vestfonna.
