= Perthesøya =

Island in Svalbard, Norway

Coordinates: 79.3412°N 20.6295°E

Perthesøya is an island at the coast of Gustav V Land at Nordaustlandet, Svalbard. It is located outside Torellneset, in the southern part of Augustabukta. The island is named after a German publishing company.
