= Kapp Hansteen =

Headland of Nordaustlandet, Svalbard

Coordinates: 80.3449°N 19.0092°E

Kapp Hansteen is a headland at the northwestern side of Nordaustlandet, Svalbard. The headland is named after astronomer Christopher Hansteen. It is located at the northern part of the peninsula Botniahalvøya, between Brennevinsfjorden and Lady Franklinfjorden.
