= Gustav V Land =

Land area on Nordaustlandet, Svalbard

Coordinates: 79°59′00″N 20°40′02″E

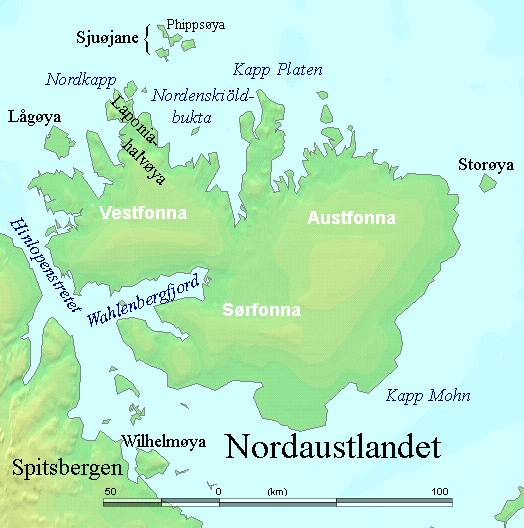
Gustav V Land is located on the northwestern part of Nordaustlandet, Svalbard.

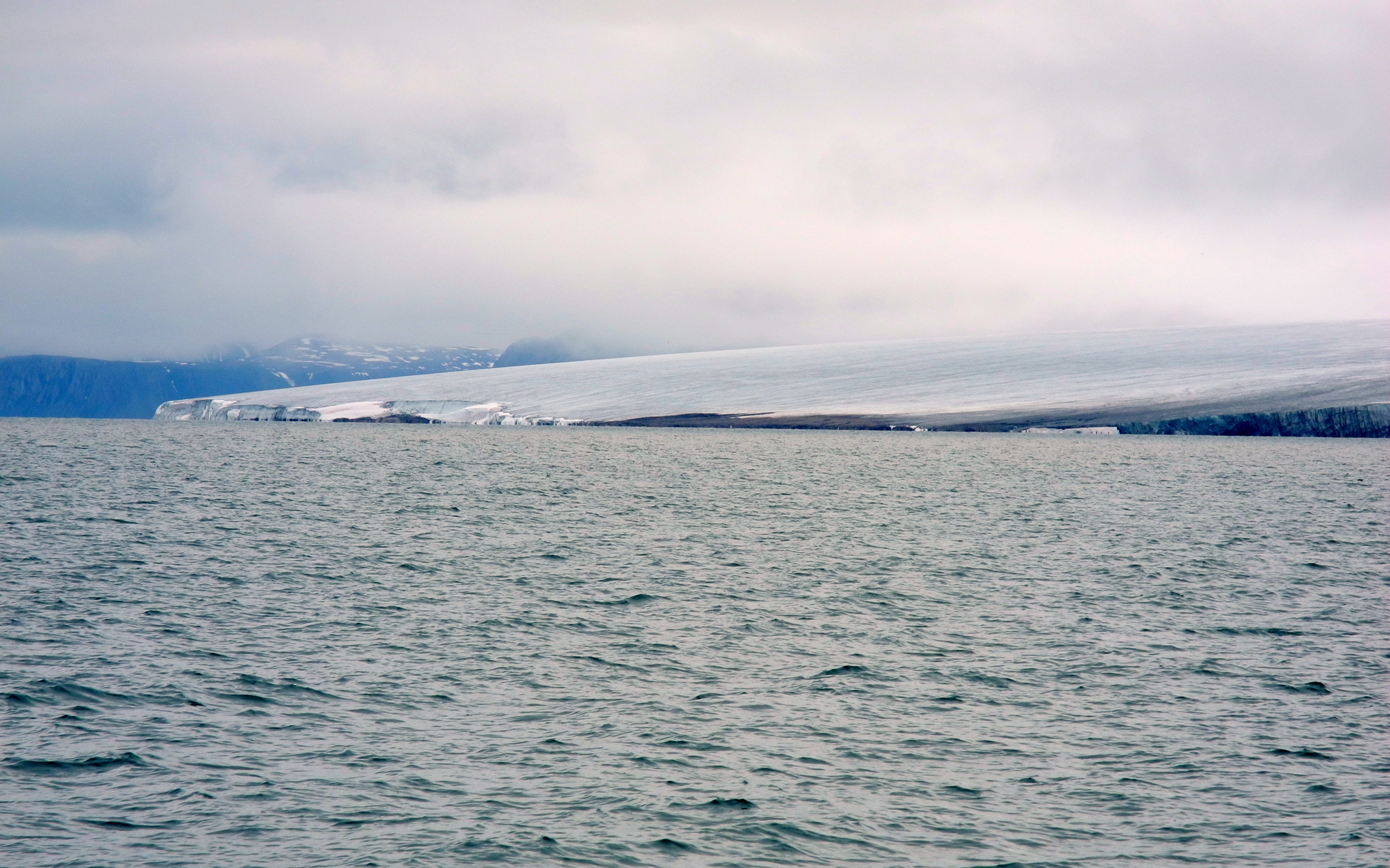
The west coast: Hinlopen Strait and the peninsula Gotiahalvøya

Gustav V Land is a land area comprising the peninsula on the northwestern part of Nordaustlandet, Svalbard in Arctic Norway. It constitutes roughly one quarter of the island's area, approximately 4000 km^{2}, being some 80 km wide east–west and 85 km north–south, connected to the rest of the island by a 22-km-wide isthmus in the southeast. The peninsula is bordered to the south by Wahlenbergfjorden, to the west by Hinlopen Strait and Hinlopenrenna, to the north by Nordkappsundet, and to the east by Nordenskiöldbukta and Rijpfjorden. Gustav Adolf Land is to the south and Prins Oscars Land is to the east. The boundary of Gustav V Land passes through Rijpdalen and Flaumdalen to Winsnesbreen in the east, continues further southwest to Brånevatnet, and thence follows the river from Brånevatnet to the sea at Bodleybukta. The highest elevation is 630 metres (2,070 ft) on the glacier Vestfonna, which covers large parts of the land.

The coast is heavily indented, especially in the west and north. Principal fjords are Murchisonfjorden to the west; Lady Franklinfjorden and Brennevinsfjorden to the northwest; Lindhagenbukta, Sabinebukta, Carolusbukta and Planciusbukta to the north; and Bengtsenbukta to the northeast. Main peninsulas are Gotiahalvøya and Storsteinhalvøya in the west, Botniahalvøya in the northwest, and Lapponiahalvøya with Kapp Rubin in the north. The largest islands are Søre Russøya in Murchisonfjorden, Lågøya in Lady Franklinfjorden, Chermsideøya and Castrénøyane north of Lapponiahalvøya, and Scoresbyøya in Nordenskiöldbukta.

Gustav V Land was named after Gustaf V (1858–1950), king of Sweden 1907–50.
