= Planciusdalen =

Valley of Svalbard, Norway

Coordinates: 80.2013°N 21.7107°E

Planciusdalen is a valley in Gustav V Land at Nordaustlandet, Svalbard. It is a continuation of the bay Planciusbukta, and stretches southwards to Rijpfjorden. The valley is named after Dutch cartographer Petrus Plancius.
