= Planciusbukta =

Bay of Svalbard

Coordinates: 80.2445°N 21.6100°E

Planciusbukta is a bay at the northern side of Nordaustlandet, Svalbard. It is located within the large bay of Nordenskiöldbukta, west of Rijpfjorden and east of Sabinebukta, between Irmingerneset and Kapp Lovén. The bay is named after Dutch cartographer Petrus Plancius. The valley Planciusdalen is a southward continuation of the bay. At the eastern side of the bay is the mountain Båtkvelvet.
