= Gimlebreen =

Glacier of Nordaustlandet, Svalbard

Coordinates: 79.7681°N 18.8394°E

Gimlebreen is a glacier in Gustav V Land at Nordaustlandet, Svalbard. It is located north of the headland of Brageneset. Gimlebreen is a glacier stream from the large icecap Vestfonna.
