= Gyldénøyane =

Islands in Svalbard, Norway

Coordinates: 79.6813°N 19.7261°E

Gyldénøyane is the name of two islands in the mouth of Wahlenbergfjorden at Nordaustlandet, Svalbard. The islands are named after Swedish Arctic explorer Hans Olof Fredrik Gyldén (son of Hugo Gyldén). They are located between the headlands of Selanderneset and Idunneset.
