= Karl Alexanderøya =

Island in Svalbard, Norway

Coordinates: 79.3127°N 21.1309°E

Karl Alexanderøya is an island in Hinlopen Strait, south of Nordaustlandet, Svalbard. It is located about four kilometers southeast of Torellneset, north of Franzøya. The island is possibly named after Charles Alexander, Grand Duke of Saxe-Weimar-Eisenach.
