= Kervelbukta =

Bay of Svalbard

Coordinates: 79.2627°N 24.1082°E

Kervelbukta is a bay at the eastern side of the glacier Bråsvellbreen in Nordaustlandet, Svalbard. The bay is named after naval officer Johan Henrik van Kervel. Bråsvellbreen, with a twenty nautical miles wide glacier front between Kervelbukta and Vibebukta, exhibited a huge surge in the 1930s.
