= Binneyfjellet =

Mountain in Svalbard, Norway

Coordinates: 80.3438°N 22.9332°E

Binneyfjellet is a mountain at Platenhalvøya in Prins Oscars Land at Nordaustlandet, Svalbard. It has a height of 607 m.a.s.l.
