= Heclahamna =

Harbour in Spitsbergen, Svalbard, Norway

Coordinates: 79°54′54″N 16°51′02″E

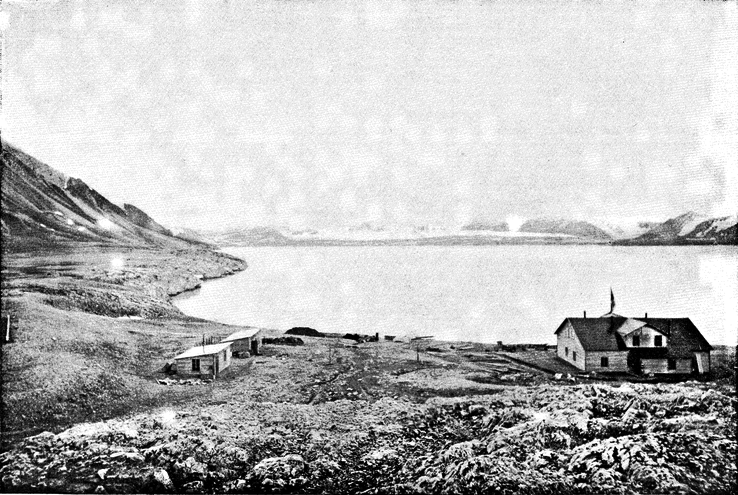

Heclahamna is a natural harbour in Ny-Friesland at Spitsbergen, Svalbard. It is located south of Crozierpynten, at the eastern side of Sorgfjorden. The harbour is named after the British naval vessel Hecla from Parry's 1827 expedition. Swedish members of the Swedish-Russian Arc-of-Meridian Expedition built a land station at this site, and overwintered there from 1899 to 1900.
