= Norvargodden =

Headland of Storøya, Svalbard

Coordinates: 80.1422°N 27.9831°E

Norvargodden is a headland and the northernmost point of the island Storøya in the Svalbard archipelago, east of Nordaustlandet. It is named after the vessel Norvarg.

== See also ==
- Polarstarodden
- Sørodden
