= Sørporten =

Strait in Svalbard, Norway

Coordinates: 79.1341°N 21.6083°E

Sørporten (Southern Gate) is the southern part of Hinlopen Strait, Svalbard. It extends between the Bastian Islands and Bråsvellbreen at Nordaustlandet.
