= Idunneset =

Headland of Nordaustlandet, Svalbard

Coordinates: 79.7190°N 19.5194°E

Idunneset, also called Indunneset Point, is a headland in Gustav V Land at Nordaustlandet, Svalbard. It is located at the northern side of Wahlenbergfjorden, east of the glacier Bragebreen.
