= Havsula =

Mountain in Svalbard, Norway

Coordinates: 80.4717°N 22.8684°E

Havsula is a mountain at Platenhalvøya in Prins Oscars Land at Nordaustlandet, Svalbard. It has a height of 415 m.a.s.l.
