= Polarstarodden =

Headland of Storøya, Svalbard

- Cape
- Coordinates: 80°08′13″N 28°02′06″E
- Location: Storøya, Svalbard, Norway

Polarstarodden is a headland at northern part of the island of Storøya in the Svalbard archipelago, east of Nordaustlandet. It is located about one kilometer southeast of Norvargodden, the most northern point of the island. The headland is named after the vessel Polarstar.

== See also ==
- Sørodden
