= Lindhagenbukta =

Bay of Svalbard

Coordinates: 80.3032°N 20.6060°E

Lindhagenbukta is a bay at the northern side of Nordaustlandet, Svalbard. It is located within the large bay of Nordenskiöldbukta, west of Sabinebukta, at the eastern side of Laponiahalvøya. The bay is named after Swedish geodesist Daniel Georg Lindhagen.
