= Kapp Laura =

Headland of Nordaustlandet, Svalbard

Coordinates: 80.0641°N 27.2112°E

Kapp Laura is a headland at the eastern side of Nordaustlandet, Svalbard. The headland is named after Laura Albertini, mother of Italian expedition leader Giovanni Albertini. The island of Storøya is located about five nautical miles to the east northeast, separated from Nordaustlandet by the strait Storøysundet.
