= Goodenoughfjellet =

Mountain in Svalbard

Coordinates: 80.4370°N 23.1279°E

Goodenoughfjellet is a mountain at Platenhalvøya in Prins Oscars Land at Nordaustlandet, Svalbard. It has a height of 529 m.a.s.l.
