= Claravågen =

Bay of Svalbard

Coordinates: 80.0855°N 18.1513°E

Claravågen is a bay cutting into the peninsula Storsteinhalvøya in Gustav V Land at Nordaustlandet, Svalbard. It is almost completely closed, except for the sound Claravågsundet leading through the narrow ridge of Molanderryggen. Inside the bay is the bay Arovika located east of the spit Engströmodden, and inside Arovika is the lagoon Wärmelaguna. The bay is named after Clara Maria Kulling.

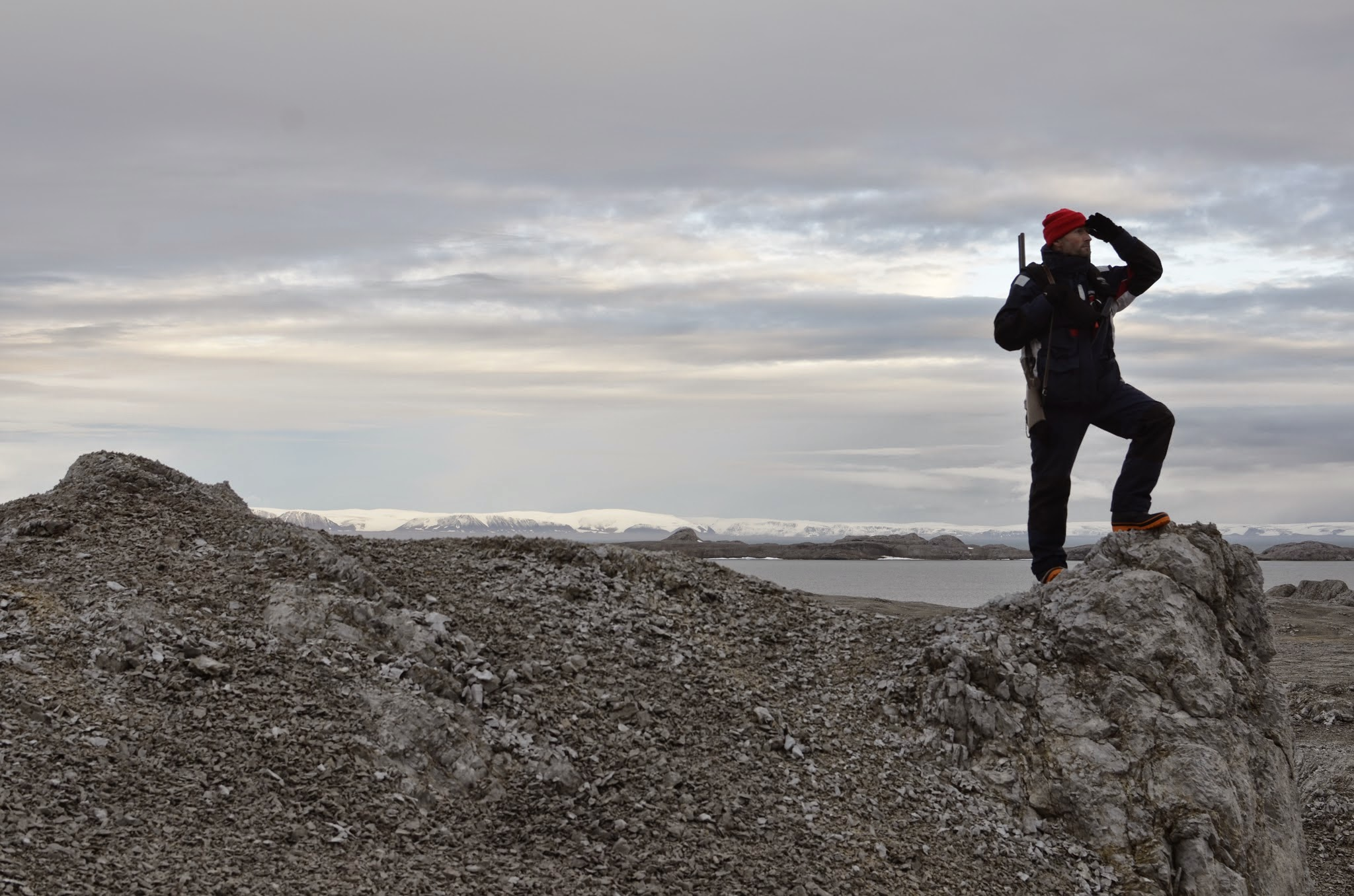
Aarsettind peak, in Claravågen at peninsula Storsteinhalvøya, Gustav V Land, Nordaustlandet - Svalbard, lat=80.0914514344, lon=18.2388508134 Photo: Lars Bugge Aarset
