= Fosterøyane =

Island group in Svalbard, Norway

Coordinates: 79.5780°N 19.2393°E

Fosterøyane is a group of islands in Hinlopen Strait, Svalbard. They are located in the middle of Hinlopenstretet, north of Vaigattøyane and east of Tommeløyane. Fosterøyane are named after Arctic traveler Henry Foster. Among the islands in the group are Krylen, Pilten and Sværingen.
