= Winsnesbreen =

Glacier in Svalbard, Norway

Coordinates: 79.788°N 22.227°E

Winsnesbreen is a glacier on Nordaustlandet, Svalbard, situated between Etonbreen and Helvetesflya. It is named after the geologist Thore Schanke Winsnes. The lake of Brånevatnet is located between Winsnesbreen and Oxfordhalvøya at the head of Wahlenbergfjorden.
