= Kløverbladbukta =

Bay of Svalbard

Coordinates: 79.7701°N 21.6419°E

Kløverbladbukta (Clover Leaf Bay) is a bay which cuts into the peninsula Oxfordhalvøya in Wahlenbergfjorden at Nordaustlandet, Svalbard. The shape of the bay resembles a cloverleaf. At the entrance of the bay are ridges which partly close the bay.
