= Kapp Platen =

Headland of Nordaustlandet, Svalbard

Coordinates: 80.5056°N 22.7729°E

Kapp Platen is a headland at Nordaustlandet, Svalbard, the northernmost point of Prins Oscars Land. The headland is named after Swedish naval officer and politician Baltzar Julius Ernst von Platen. Kapp Platen includes the mountain Havsula.
