= Norddomen =

Ice dome in Svalbard, Norway

Coordinates: 79.8217°N 23.9797°E

Norddomen (The North Dome) is an ice dome of Austfonna at Nordaustlandet, Svalbard. The glacier cap of Austfonna has two significant ice domes, Norddomen and Sørdomen further south. Norddomen is the highest point of Nordaustlandet, with a height of about 700 m.a.s.l.
