= Ekstremfjorden =

Fjord in Svalbard, Norway

Coordinates: 80.4053°N 20.0927°E

Ekstremfjorden is a fjord at the northern coast of Nordaustlandet, Svalbard, east of Laponiahalvøya. It mouths into the western part of Nordenskiöldbukta.
