= Berggrenøya =

Island in Svalbard, Norway

Coordinates: 79°21′07″N 19°21′31″E

Berggrenøya is an island in Hinlopen Strait in the Svalbard archipelago, the most western of the islands of Vaigattøyane. The island is named after Swedish botanist Sven Berggren. The highest point is 23 m.a.s.l. Total area approximately 0,6 km^{2}. acc. to Norwegian Polar Institute. Beggrenøya is included in the Nordaust-Svalbard Nature Reserve.
