= Franklinfjellet =

Mountain in Svalbard, Norway

Coordinates: 80.2365°N 19.2254°E

Franklinfjellet is a mountain in Gustav V Land, on the peninsula Botniahalvøya of Nordaustlandet, Svalbard, Norway. It has a height of 430 m.a.s.l. The mountain is named after British naval officer John Franklin.
