= Augusta Bay =

Augusta Bay may refer to:

- Augusta Bay, Sicily, Italy
- Empress Augusta Bay, Bahamas
- Augusta Bay, Nordaustlandet, Svalbard, Norway
- Augusta Bay, Nunavut, Canada
