= Isisøyane =

Island group in Svalbard, Norway

Coordinates: 79.7005°N 26.6582°E

Isisøyane is a group of small islands east of Nordaustlandet, Svalbard. They were earlier regarded to be part of Nordaustlandet, an ice free point named Isispynten. After the retreat of Austfonna, the islands appeared as islands. They were named Isisøyane in 2009.
