= Carolusbukta =

Bay of Svalbard

Coordinates: 80.2153°N 21.3502°E

Carolusbukta is a bay at the northern side of Nordaustlandet, Svalbard. It is located in the bay of Nordenskiöldbukta, west of Rijpfjorden, and is separated from Sabinebukta by the peninsula Reinhalvøya. The bay is named after Dutch cartographer Joris Carolus. It has a length of about three nautical miles.
