= Oxfordhalvøya =

Peninsula at Svalbard

Coordinates: 79.785°N 21.735°E

Oxfordhalvøya is a peninsula in Wahlenbergfjorden at the southwestern side of Nordaustlandet, Svalbard. It is located between Bodleybukta and Etonbreen at the head of the fjord. The bay Kløverbladbukta cuts into the peninsula, and its highest point is Carfaxhaugen at 103 m.a.s.l. The river of Oxfordelva flows from the lake of Brånevatnet through Oxfordhalvøya, and debouches into Bodleybukta.
