= Zorgdragerfjorden =

Fjord in Svalbard, Norway

Coordinates: 80°23′N 22°42′E

Zorgdragerfjorden is a fjord at the northern coast of Nordaustlandet, Svalbard, west of Platenhalvøya, in Prins Oscars Land. The fjord is named after Dutch captain Cornelis Gijsbertsz Zorgdrager.
