= Sørodden =

Headland of Storøya, Svalbard

Coordinates: 80.0481°N 28.0456°E

Sørodden is a headland and the most southern point of the island Storøya in the Svalbard archipelago, east of Nordaustlandet. The headland is also the southern part of the glacier Storøyjøkulen.

== See also ==
- Polarstarodden
- Norvargodden
