= Søre Russøya =

Island in Svalbard, Norway

Coordinates: 79.9612°N 18.2343°E

Søre Russøya is an island at the northwestern side of Nordaustlandet, Svalbard. It is located in the outer part of Murchisonfjorden, and is the largest of the group of three islands called Russøyane. The island is separated from Nordaustlandet by the strait of Søre Russøysundet. Further west is island Krossøya. The island has an area of about, 10 km^{2}.. Highest point, 71 m.a.s.l.. Søre Russøya is part of the Nordaust-Svalbard Nature Reserve.
