= Krossøya =

Island in Svalbard, Norway

Coordinates: 79.9607°N 18.0167°E

Krossøya is an island at the northwestern side of Nordaustlandet, Svalbard. It is located in the outer part of Murchisonfjorden, separated by Nordre Russøysundet from Søre Russøya, further east, and south of Depotøya. The name Krossøya originates from an old Russian cross, erected at the top of the island. Krossøya is included in Nordaust-Svalbard Nature Reserve.
