= Sørdomen =

Ice cap in Svalbard, Norway

Coordinates: 79.6179°N 23.5172°E

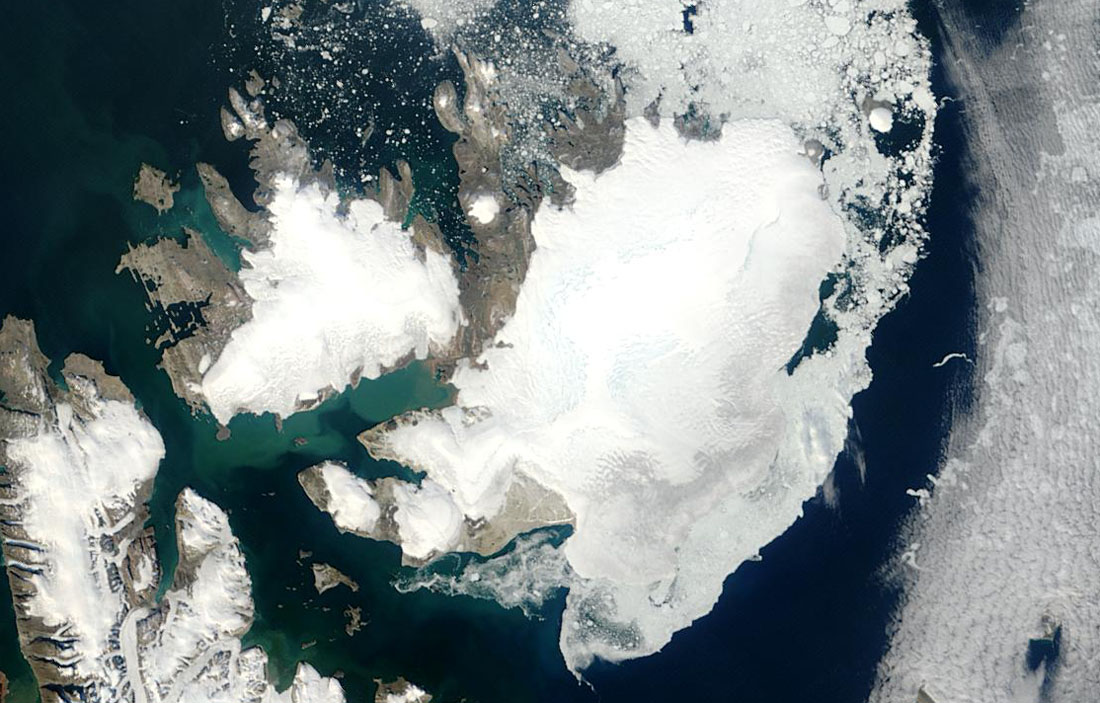
Terra MODIS satellite image of Nordaustlandet, Svalbard

Sørdomen (The Southern Dome) is an ice dome of Austfonna at Nordaustlandet, Svalbard. The glacier cap of Austfonna has two significant ice domes, Sørdomen and Norddomen further north. The part of Austfonna west of Sørdomen is called Palanderisen.
