= Brånevatnet =

Lake

- Location in Svalbard
- Location: Nordaustlandet, Svalbard
- Coordinates: 79.788°N 22.004°E
- Type: natural freshwater lake
- Basin countries: Norway

Brånevatnet ("Melting lake") is a lake at Nordaustlandet, Svalbard. It is located between Winsnesbreen and Oxfordhalvøya, to the north of Etonbreen. The river of Oxfordelva flows from Brånevatnet through Oxfordhalvøya and debouches into Bodleybukta.
