= Lindhagen =

Lindhagen is a surname. Notable people with the name include:

- Albert Lindhagen (1823–1887), Swedish city planner, lawyer and politician
- Anna Lindhagen (1870–1941), Swedish politician
- Carl Lindhagen (1860–1946), Swedish lawyer, socialist politician and pacifist
- Erik Lindhagen (born 1987), Swedish ice hockey centre

== See also ==
- Lindhagenbukta, is a bay at the northern side of Nordaustlandet, Svalbard
