= Isispynten =

Headland of Isisøyane, Svalbard

- Cape
- Coordinates: 79°42′07″N 26°40′44″E
- Location: Isisøyane, Svalbard, Norway

Isispynten is the most eastern point of Isisøyane, east of Nordaustlandet, Svalbard. It was earlier regarded as a headland of Nordaustlandet, but after the retreat of Austfonna, it became apparent that the point was on a separate small island.
