= Augusta Bay (Nordaustlandet) =

Bight in Svalbard, Norway

Coordinates: 79.38°N 20.56°E

Augusta Bay (Norwegian: Augustabukta) is a bay of Nordaustlandet, Svalbard archipelago, Norway.

Its mouth is open to the Hinlopen Strait. It is located in the southwestern part of the island, southern part of its Scaniahalvøya (Scania Peninsula).
