= Tommeløyane =

Island group in Svalbard, Norway

Coordinates: 79.5466°N 18.8469°E

Tommeløyane (Thumb Islands) is a group of islands in Hinlopen Strait, Svalbard. They are located towards Lomfjordhalvøya, and west of Fosterøyane. Among the islands in the group are Strilane, Tommelen and Steiløya.
