= Vibebukta =

Bay of Svalbard

Coordinates: 79.3558°N 22.6088°E

Vibebukta is a bay at the shore of Nordaustlandet, Svalbard. The bay is named after hydrographer Andreas Vibe. It lies between Gustav Adolf Land and the glacier Bråsvellbreen. The twenty nautical miles wide glacier front of Bråsvellbreen, between Vibebukta and Kervelbukta, exhibited a huge surge in the 1930s.
