= Snøtoppen =

Mountain in Gustav V Land at Nordaustlandet Island in Svalbard, Norway

Coordinates: 80.4190°N 19.5987°E

Snøtoppen (The Snow Top) is a mountain in Gustav V Land at Nordaustlandet Island, in Svalbard, Norway. With an elevation of 764 m (2,507 ft) it is the highest mountain of the island of Nordaustlandet; it is located on Laponiahalvøya Peninsula.
