= Storøysundet =

Strait in the Svalbard archipelago

Coordinates: 80°05′00″N 27°21′42″E

Storøysundet is a strait in the Svalbard archipelago. It separates the island of Storøya to the east from Nordaustlandet to the west.

The area is included in the Nordaust-Svalbard Nature Reserve.
