= Sabine Islands =

Island group in Svalbard, Norway

Native name: Sabineøyane
- Location within Svalbard

Geography
- Coordinates: 80.2722°N 21.1879°E

Administration
- Norway

The Sabine Islands (/ˈseɪbɪn/ SAY-bin; Norwegian: Sabineøyane) are a group of islands at the northern side of Nordaustlandet, Svalbard. They are located south of Scoresbyøya, in the bay of Sabinebukta. The islands are named after Arctic explorer Edward Sabine. The most northern island has a length of about 1.5 kilometers (1 mi) and is the largest of the islands.
