= Platenhalvøya =

Peninsula in Svalbard, Norway

Coordinates: 80.2725°N 22.8480°E

Platenhalvøya is a peninsula at Nordaustlandet, Svalbard, between Zorgdragerfjorden and Duvefjorden. The peninsula constitutes the northeastern part of Prins Oscars Land. The mountains Binneyfjellet and Goodenoughfjellet are among the highest peaks of Nordaustlandet.

The northernmost point of Platenhalvøya is called Kapp Platen.
