= Westmanbukta =

Bay of Svalbard

Coordinates: 80.1780°N 18.6503°E

Westmanbukta is a bay at the northern side of Storsteinhalvøya in Gustav V Land at Nordaustlandet, Svalbard. The bay is named after Swedish meteorologist Jonas Westman.
