= Swedish–Russian Arc-of-Meridian Expedition =

Scientific expedition

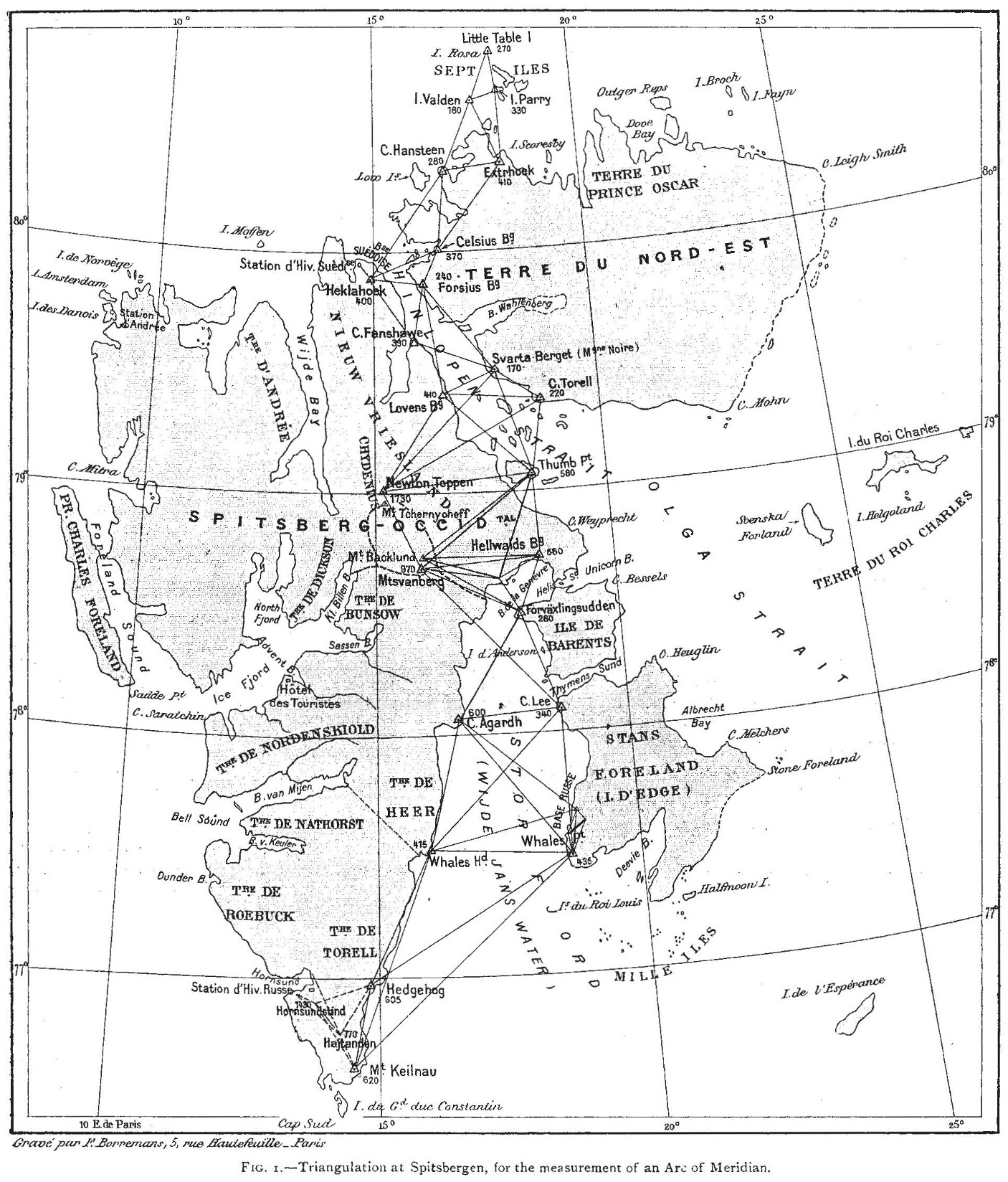
Triangulation work carried out during the Swedish-Russian Arc-of-Meridian expedition

The Swedish–Russian Arc-of-Meridian expedition was a scientific expedition to Svalbard that took place from 1899 to 1902. The main purpose of the mission was to measure a meridian arc, in order to determine the earth flattening at the poles.

The measurements were done by establishing a chain of triangulation points from Keilhaufjellet in Sørkapp Land to Vesle Tavleøya north of Nordaustlandet. The Russians were responsible for the southern measurements, while the Swedes performed the northern measurements from a base at Crozierpynten on the eastern side of Sorgfjorden.

A total arc of 4° 10' was measured.

The expedition also took the first photographs of the aurora.
