= Vaigattøyane =

Group of islands

Coordinates: 79°24′N 20°00′E

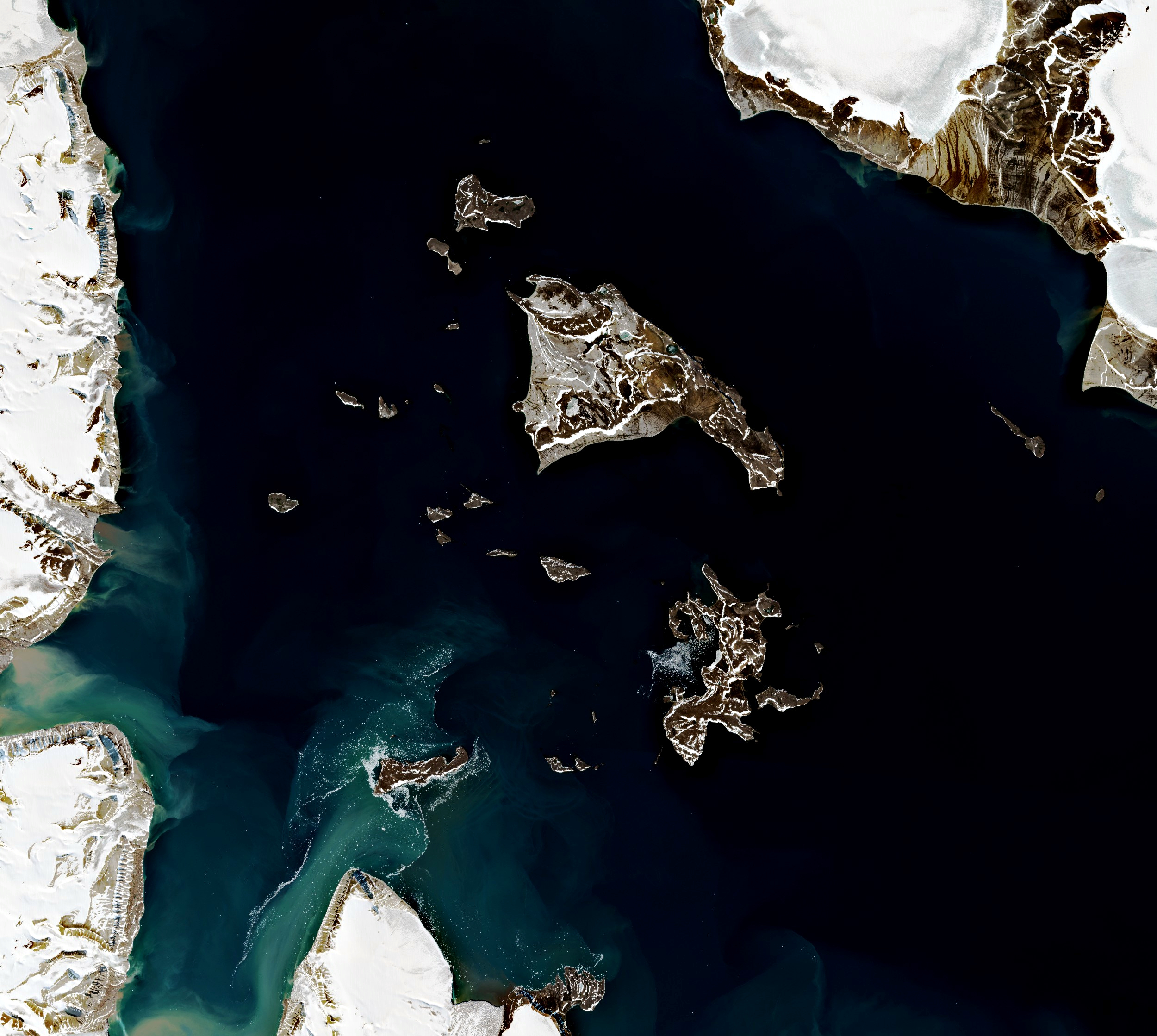
Sentinel-2 image (2021)

Vaigattøyane is a group of islands in Hinlopen Strait, between Spitsbergen and Nordaustlandet of the Svalbard archipelago. The island group is named after Waygat, a previous name of Hinlopenstretet.

The largest island of the group is Wahlbergøya, while other islands are Von Otterøya, Nyströmøya and Berggrenøya.
