= Bengtssenbukta =

Bay of Svalbard

Coordinates: 80.1309°N 21.6791°E

Bengtssenbukta is a bay at the northern side of Nordaustlandet, Svalbard. It is a western branch of Rijpfjorden. The glacier Rijpbreen debouches into the bay. The bay is named after trapper Karl J. Bengtssen.
