= Storøyjøkulen =

Ice cap covering the southern part of the island Storøya in the Svalbard archipelago

Coordinates: 80.0779°N 28.0518°E

Storøyjøkulen is an ice cap covering the southern part of the island Storøya in the Svalbard archipelago, east of Nordaustlandet. The glacier reaches a height of about 250 m.a.s.l. The southern tip of the glacier forms the headland Sørodden.
