= Franklinsundet =

Coordinates: 80.2181°N 18.3724°E

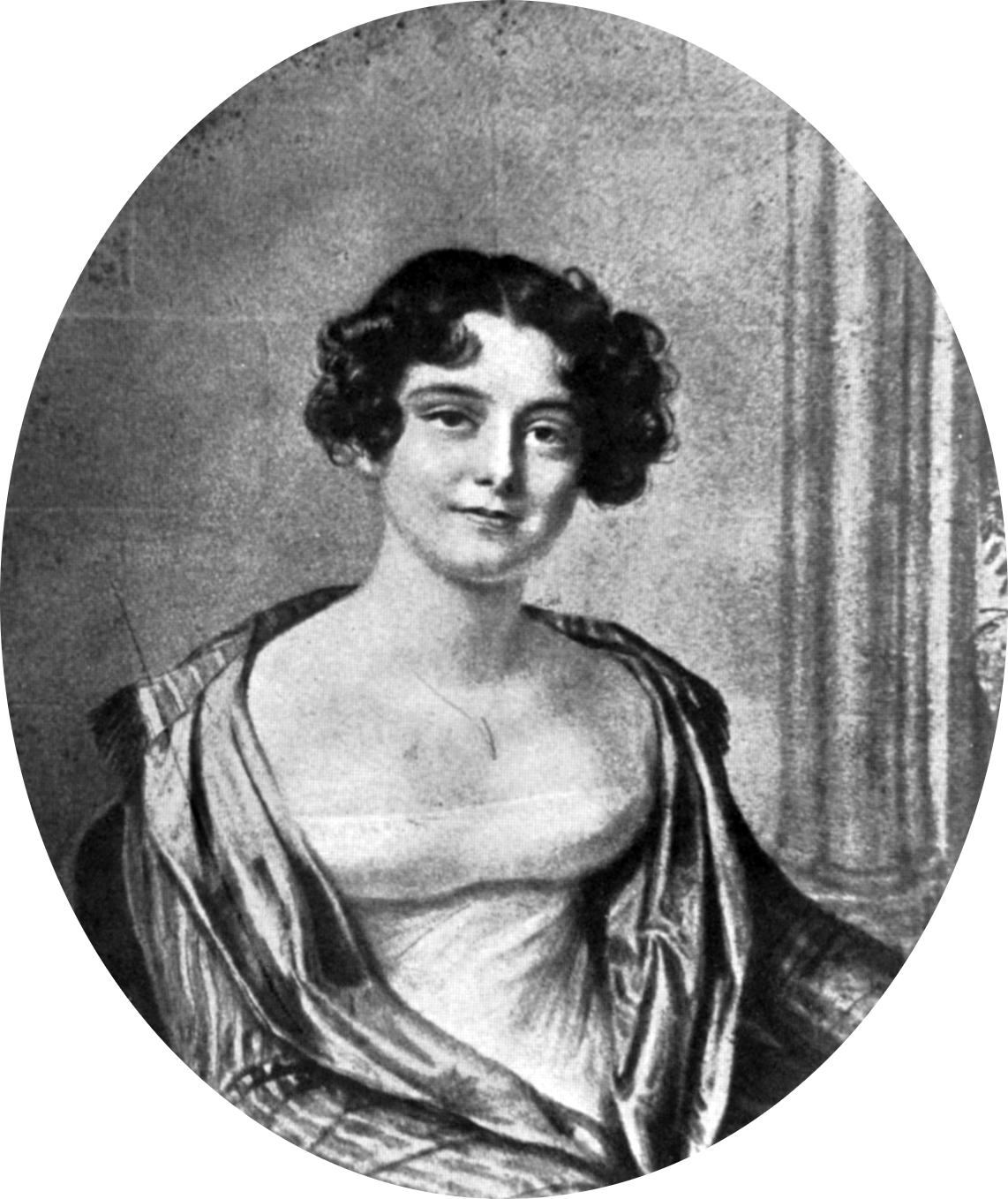
Lady Jane Franklin gave her name to Franklinsundet and Lady Franklinfjorden.

Franklinsundet is a strait between Storsteinhalvøya and Lågøya at the northern side of Nordaustlandet, Svalbard. The eastern side of the strait leads into Lady Franklinfjorden, named after Jane Franklin.
