= Verlegenhukflya =

Coastal plain in Svalbard, Norway

Coordinates: 80.0166°N 16.3132°E

Verlegenhukflya is a coastal plain in Ny-Friesland at Spitsbergen, Svalbard. It is located at the northern part of the peninsula Mosselhalvøya. The northernmost point of the plain is Verlegenhuken.
