= Botniahalvøya =

Peninsula in Svalbard, Norway

Coordinates: 80.2651°N 19.2559°E

Botniahalvøya is a peninsula of Nordaustlandet, Svalbard. It is located between Lady Franklinfjorden and Brennevinsfjorden. It has a length of about twelve nautical miles. The highest peak is Franklinfjellet, at 430 m.a.s.l.
