= Alkefjellet =

Mountain in Spitsbergen, Norway

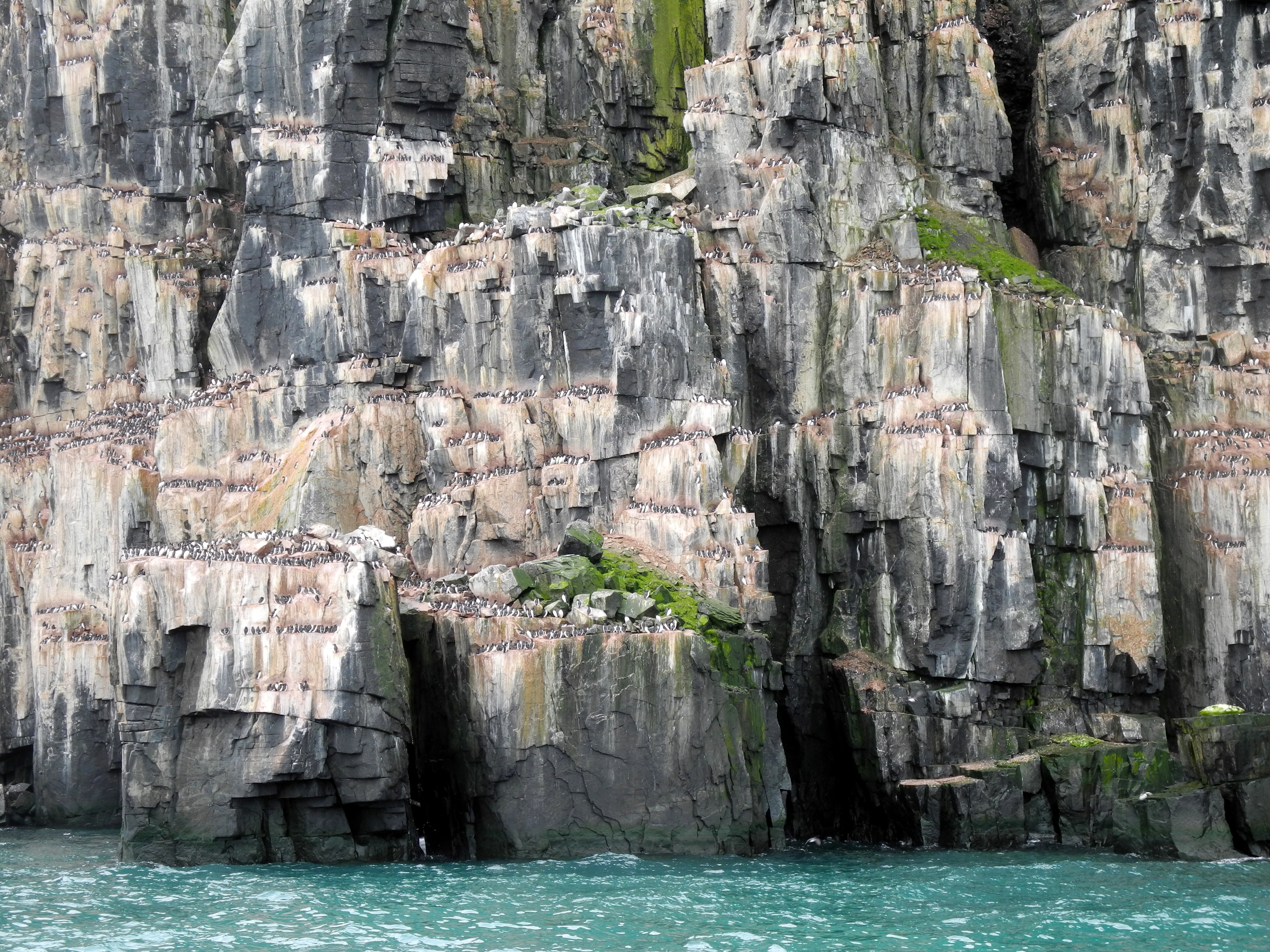
- Birds at Alkefjellet.

Highest point
- Coordinates: 79.5848°N 18.4608°E

Geography
- Location within Svalbard
- Location: Lomfjordhalvøya in Ny-Friesland, Spitsbergen, Svalbard, Norway

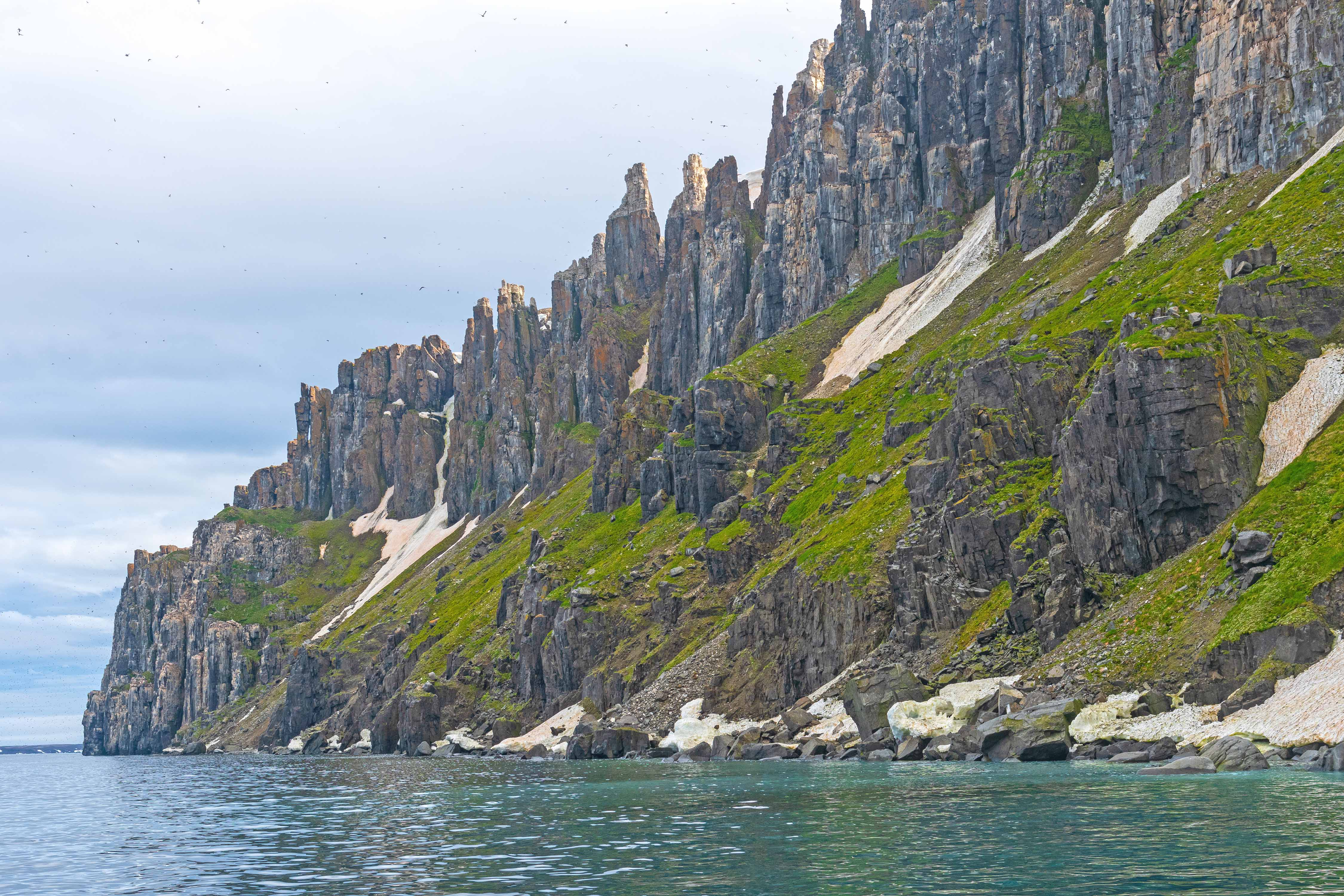
The Cliffs of Alkefjellet

Alkefjellet is a cliff in Lomfjordhalvøya in Ny-Friesland at Spitsbergen, Svalbard. Alkefjellet is a bird cliff facing towards Hinlopen Strait.

Alkefjellet (‘mount guillemot’) is the nesting location for over 60,000 breeding pairs of Brünnich’s guillemots. The cliffs are made of basalt columns up to100 m high, interspersed with a dark layer – a dolerite intrusion. The molten rock, as it intruded caused the limestone in the contact zone to re-crystalize and form marble.
