= Bodleybukta =

Bay of Svalbard

Coordinates: 79.808°N 21.621°E

Bodleybukta is a bay at the inner end of Wahlenbergfjorden, at the western side of Nordaustlandet, Svalbard. The bay is named after English diplomat Sir Thomas Bodley. It is located west of the peninsula Oxfordhalvøya. The lake Brånevatnet further east drains into the bay. The glacier Bodleybreen debouches into the northern part of the bay.
