= Wahlbergøya =

Island

Coordinates: 79°22′06″N 19°48′30″E

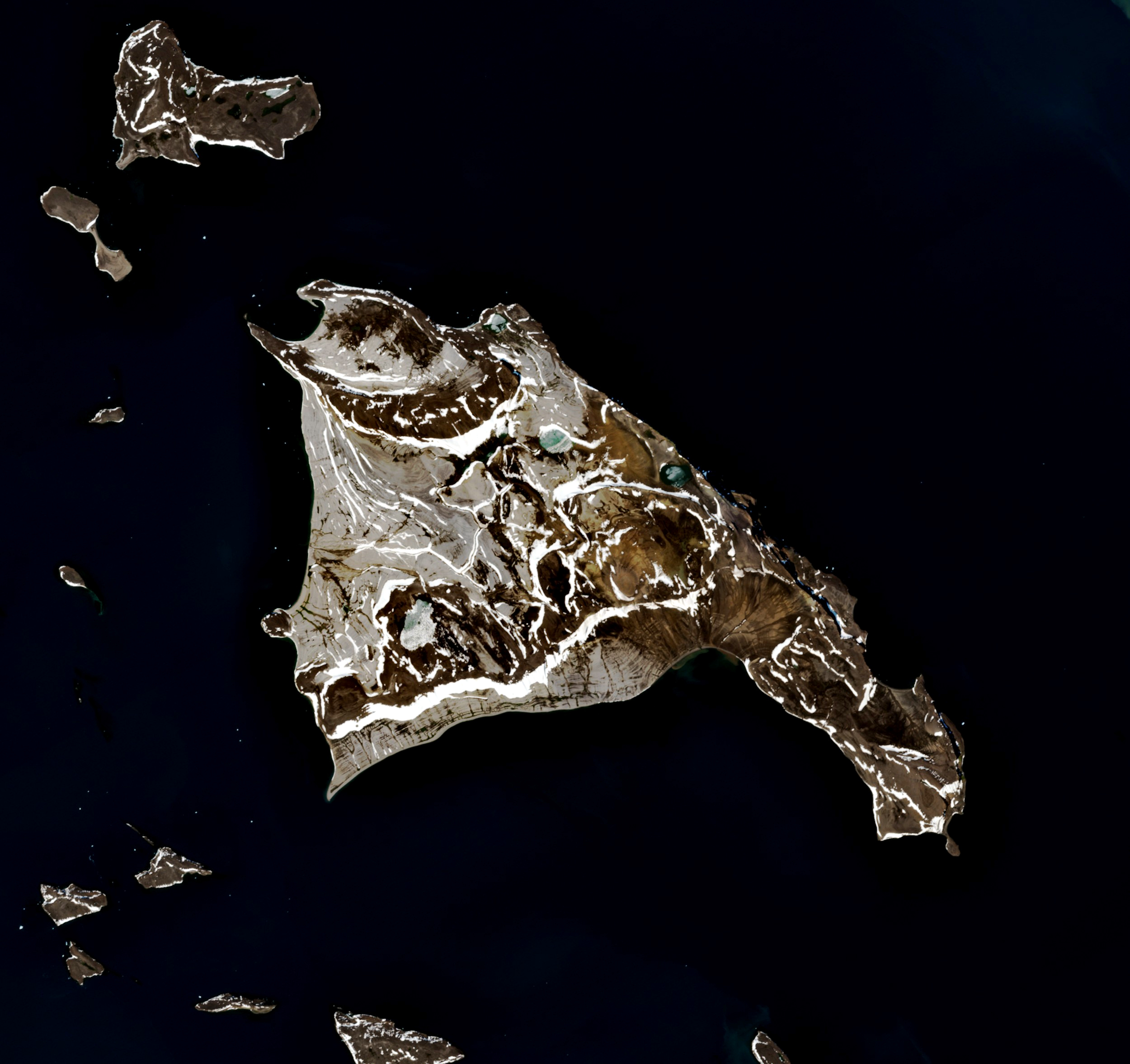
Sentinel-2 image (2021)

Wahlbergøya is an island in Hinlopen Strait, between Spitsbergen and Nordaustlandet of the Svalbard archipelago. The island has an area of about 48 km^{2} (19 sq mi). The islands highest point is 194 m.a.s.l. Named after Swedish botanist Peter Fredrik Wahlberg. It is the largest island of Vaigattøyane.

The island is included in the Nordaust-Svalbard Nature Reserve.
