= Mosselbukta =

Bay in Svalbard, Norway

Coordinates: 79°53′N 15°54′E

Mosselbukta is a bay in Ny-Friesland at Spitsbergen, Svalbard. It has a length of about five kilometers, and is located at the mouth of Wijdefjorden, east of the peninsula Mosselhalvøya.
