= Crozierpynten =

Headland located in Svalbard, Norway

Coordinates: 79.919°N 16.840°E

Crozierpynten is a headland in Ny-Friesland at Spitsbergen, Svalbard. It is located north of Heclahamna at the eastern side of Sorgfjorden. It is named after lieutenant Crozier, member of an Arctic expedition in 1827.
