= Scoresbyøya =

Norwegian island

Coordinates: 80°21′00″N 21°23′06″E

Scoresbyøya is an island in the Svalbard archipelago, north of Nordaustlandet. It has an area of about 6 km², and is located in Nordenskiöldbukta, outside the bay of Sabinebukta. The island is named after Arctic explorer William Scoresby. The southern part of the island is dominated by a large lagoon and narrow sand banks.
