= Storsteinhalvøya =

Peninsula in Svalbard, Norway

Coordinates: 80.1139°N 18.5220°E

Storsteinhalvøya is a peninsula at the northwestern side of Nordaustlandet, Svalbard. It is surrounded by Murchisonfjorden to the south, Franklinsundet to the north, and Lady Franklinfjorden to the northeast. The peninsula is almost free of glaciated areas, and contains some lakes. The nearly closed bay Claravågen is located at the western side, and Pentavika and Westmanbukta at the northern side.
