= Prins Oscars Land =

Area of Svalbard, Norway

Coordinates: 80°8.8′N 22°55.6′E

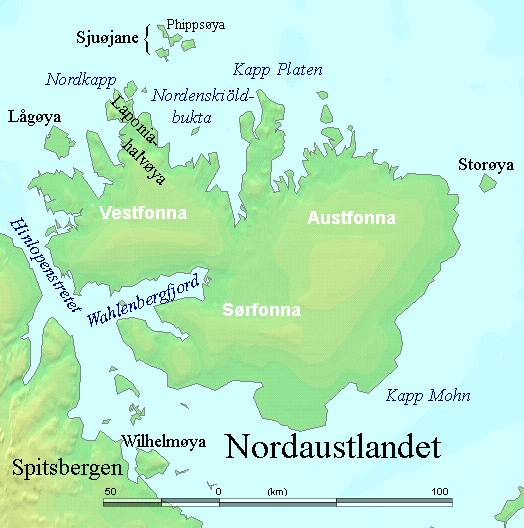
Prins Oscars Land is located on the northern part of Nordaustlandet, Svalbard.

Prins Oscars Land is a land area constituting mainly Platenhalvøya, a peninsula between Rijpfjorden in the west and Duvefjorden with Fortherbyfjorden and Innvika on Nordaustlandet, Svalbard in Arctic Norway. It borders Gustav V Land to the west, Gustav Adolf Land to the south, Orvin Land and Austfonna to the east. Limit over land through Rijpdalen and Flaumdalen in the west, to Winsnesbreen in the south, the lower part of Austfonna, through Fonndalen and Innvikdalen to the east.

Named after Prince Oscar (1829 – 1907), later King Oscar II of Norway (1872 - 1905) and Sweden (1872 - 1907).
