= Mosselhalvøya =

Peninsula in Svalbard, Norway

Coordinates: 79°56′N 16°18′E

Mosselhalvøya is a peninsula in Ny-Friesland at Spitsbergen, Svalbard. It is located between Mosselbukta and Sorgfjorden. At the northern part of the peninsular is the coastal plain of Verlegenhukflya, with its northernmost point Verlegenhuken.
