= Nordenskiöld Bay =

Bay of Svalbard

- Nordenskiöldbukta (Norwegian)
- Location in Svalbard
- Location: Nordaustlandet, Svalbard
- Coordinates: 80°23′04″N 21°35′09″E
- Ocean/sea sources: Arctic Ocean
- Basin countries: Norway
- Max. width: 46.3 km (28.8 mi)

Nordenskiöld Bay (Norwegian: Nordenskiöldbukta) is a bay on the northern coast of Nordaustlandet, Svalbard.

The bay is named after Arctic explorer Adolf Erik Nordenskiöld.

== Geography ==
Located between Laponiahalvøya and Prins Oscars Land, the bay is facing north and has a width of about 25 nautical miles. It contains several fjords and smaller bays, including Ekstremfjorden, Sabinebukta, Carolusbukta and Rijpfjorden.
