= Augusta Bay (Nunavut) =

Bay in Nunavut, Canada

- Location within Nunavut
- Location: Ellesmere Island
- Coordinates: 78°53′N 81°45′W
- Ocean/sea sources: Arctic Ocean
- Basin countries: Canada
- Settlements: Uninhabited

Augusta Bay is a bay of the Ellesmere Island, Nunavut, Canada. Meltwater from the Prince of Wales Icefield channels into the bay with its mouth opening into the Bay Fiord.
