= Torellneset =

Headland

- Cape
- Coordinates: 79°21′49″N 20°44′06″E
- Location: Nordaustlandet, Svalbard, Norway

Torellneset is a headland at the southwestern side of Nordaustlandet, Svalbard. The headland is named after geologist Otto Martin Torell. It is located south of the glacier Vegafonna and is the southwestern point of Gustav Adolf Land. Outside the headland is the island of Perthesøya.
