= Verlegenhuken =

Headland in Spitsbergen, Svalbard

Coordinates: 80.0607°N 16.2500°E

Verlegenhuken is the northernmost point of Ny-Friesland at Spitsbergen, Svalbard. It is located north of the coastal plain Verlegenhukflya at the peninsula Mosselhalvøya. Verlegenhuken is the most northern point of Spitsbergen.

Among older names of the point are Verlegen hoeck, Cap Vertegen, Cap Lointain, Point Desire, Ferlejenhuk, Vrangneset, and Langenes.
