= Murchisonfjorden =

Fjord in Svalbard, Norway

Coordinates: 80.0031°N 18.4852°E

Murchisonfjorden is a fjord in Gustav V Land at Nordaustlandet, Svalbard. The fjord cuts eastwards from Hinlopen Strait into Nordaustlandet. It has steep coasts and numerous islands. Murchisonfjorden is named after British geologist Roderick Murchison.
