= Vegafonna =

Ice cap in Gustav Adolf Land on Nordaustlandet in the Svalbard archipelago

Coordinates: 79°27′03″N 21°07′04″E

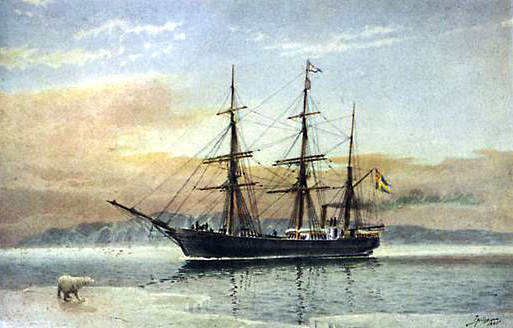
Vegafonna is named after the barque SS Vega.

Vegafonna is an ice cap in Gustav Adolf Land on Nordaustlandet in the Svalbard archipelago. It is located on the peninsula Scaniahalvøya, between the bay Palanderbukta to the north and Torellneset to the south. The glacier is named after the vessel SS Vega. Further west on the peninsula is the ice cap Glitnefonna.

== See also ==
- List of glaciers in Svalbard
