= Etonbreen =

Glacier

Coordinates: 79°43.8′N 21°59.7′E

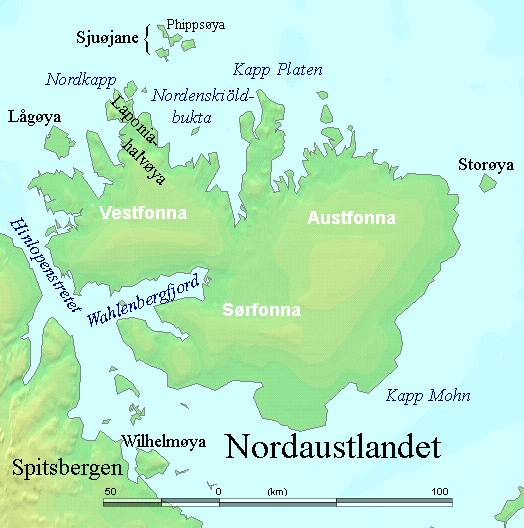
Etonbreen is a glacier located on the west coast of Nordaustlandet, Svalbard.

Etonbreen is a glacier on Nordaustlandet, Svalbard. The glacier debouches into Wahlenbergfjorden. It is named after Eton College.
