= Brennevinsfjorden =

Fjord in Gustav V Land at Nordaustlandet, Svalbard

Coordinates: 80°10′N 19°30′E

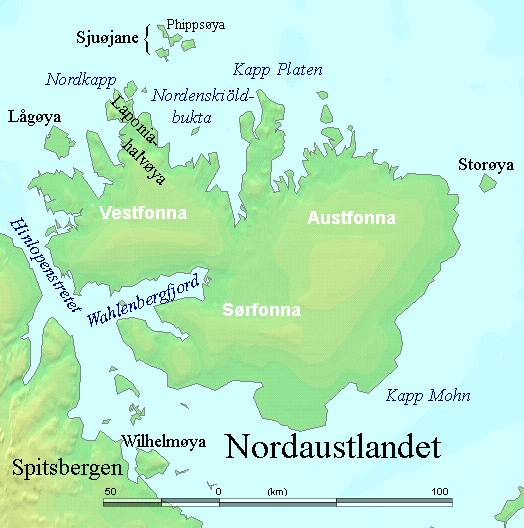
Brennevinsfjorden

Brennevinsfjorden is a fjord in Gustav V Land at Nordaustlandet, Svalbard. The fjord has a length of about eleven nautical miles, and runs in between Depotodden and Kapp Hansteen.
