= Lady Franklinfjorden =

Coordinates: 80°13′36″N 18°56′24″E

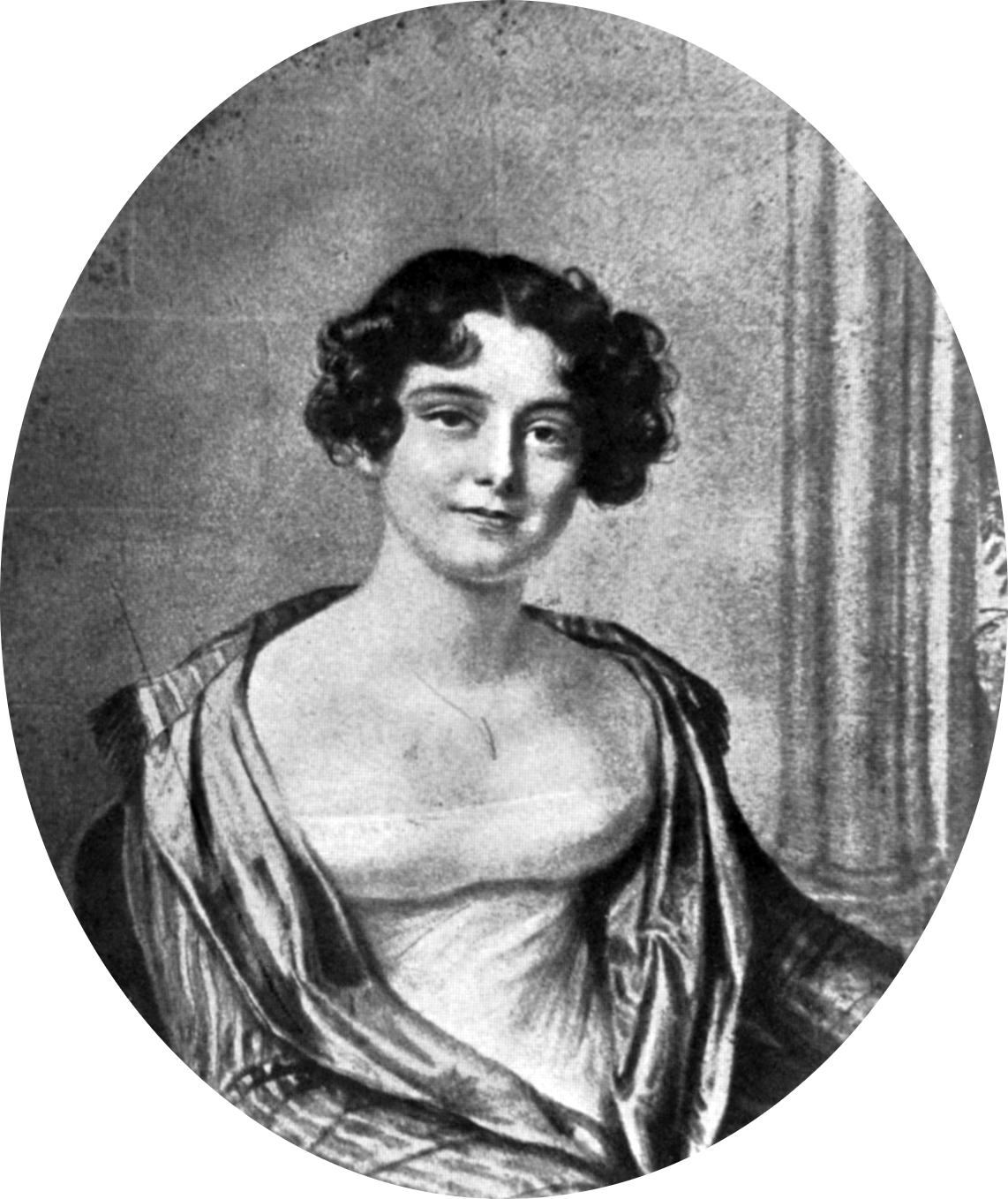
Lady Jane Franklin gave name to Franklinsundet and Lady Franklinfjorden.

Lady Franklinfjorden is a fjord in Gustav V Land at Nordaustlandet, Svalbard. The fjord has a length of about 25 kilometers. Lady Franklinfjorden is named after Jane Franklin, the wife of Arctic explorer John Franklin.
