= Laponiahalvøya =

Peninsula at Nordaustlandet, Svalbard

Coordinates: 80°18′03″N 20°10′00″E

Laponiahalvøya is a peninsula at Nordaustlandet, Svalbard, east of Brennevinsfjorden and west of Nordenskiöldbukta. The peninsula has a length of about 18 nautical miles. The landscape consists of mountains between 300 and 600 meters; the highest is Snøtoppen (620 m.a.s.l.)
