= Storøya =

Island in the Svalbard archipelago

Coordinates: 80°06′N 28°05′E

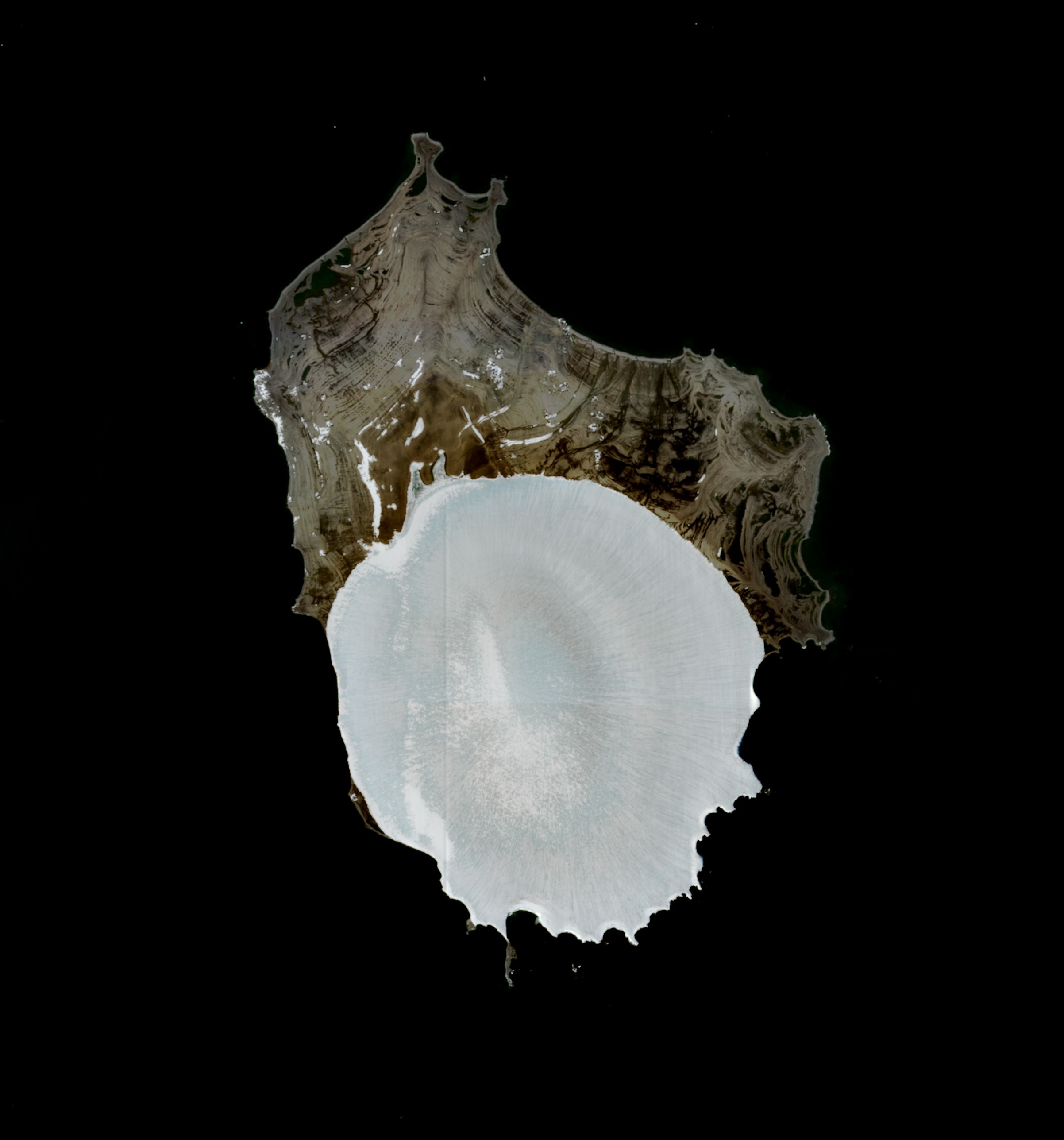
Sentinel-2 image (2018)

Storøya is an island in the Svalbard archipelago. It is located east of Nordaustlandet, separated from Nordaustlandet by the strait of Storøysundet. The southern part of the island is covered by the glacier Storøyjøkulen.

Storøya is included in the Nordaust-Svalbard Nature Reserve. Its highest point is about 250 m.a.s.l.
