= Sorgfjorden =

Fjord in Svalbard, Norway

Coordinates: 79°55′N 16°47′E

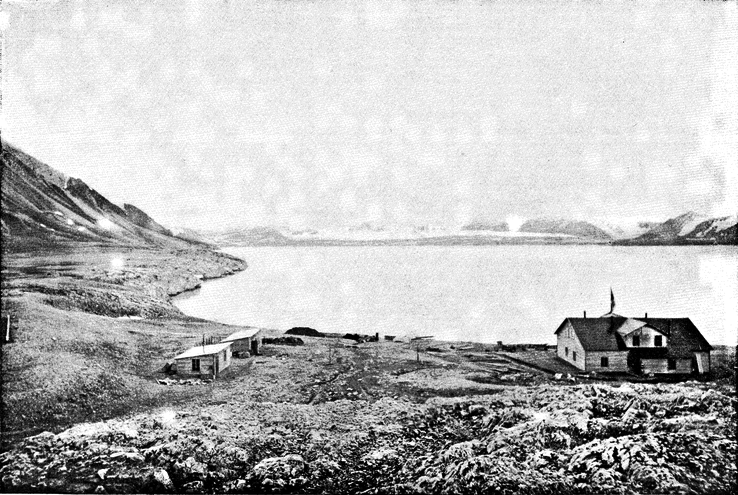
From Sorgfjorden, around 1900.

Sorgfjorden is a fjord at the northeastern coast of Spitsbergen, Svalbard. It cuts into Ny-Friesland, from the northern part of Hinlopen Strait. It is also called Treurenberg Bay.
