= Bråsvellbreen =

Glacier in Norway

Coordinates: 79°22.1′N 23°26.6′E

Bråsvellbreen (English: The Sudden Swell Glacier) is a glacier in Nordaustlandet, Svalbard. The glacier is a 45 kilometre long stream southwards from the ice dome Sørdomen of Austfonna, debouching into the sea on the south coast. In the late 1930s it was observed that the glacier had exhibited a recent huge surge, forming a ten kilometre long tongue into the sea.

This glacier, representing 13% of the total surface of Austfonna, is well known in the Arctic for its spectacular waterfalls and glacial streams.
