= Sabinebukta =

Bay of Svalbard

Coordinates: 80.2425°N 21.0051°E

Sabinebukta (Norwegian pronunciation: [ˈsɛ̀ɪbɪnˌbʊktɑ]) is a bay at the northern side of Nordaustlandet, Svalbard. The bay is split into Vestre Sabinevågen and Austre Sabinevågen. The Sabine Islands are located in the outer part of the bay. The bay is named after Arctic explorer Edward Sabine.
