= Vestfonna =

Glacier at Nordaustlandet, Svalbard, Norway

Coordinates: 79°57′N 20°30′E

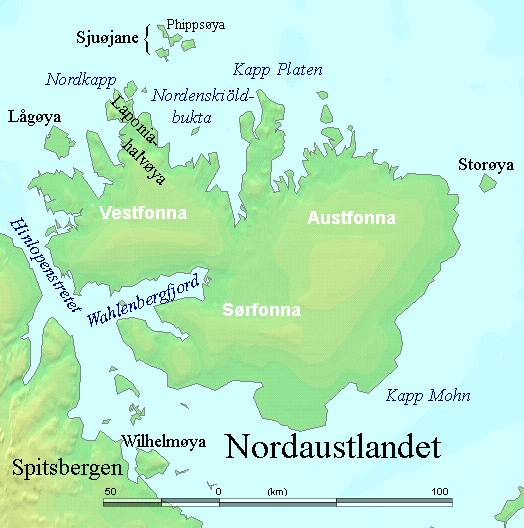
- Vestfonna on the island Nordaustlandet. It is separated from Austfonna, the island's largest ice cap.
- Interactive map of Vestfonna
- Location: Svalbard, Arctic Ocean, Norway
- Area: 2,500 km^{2} (618,000 acres)

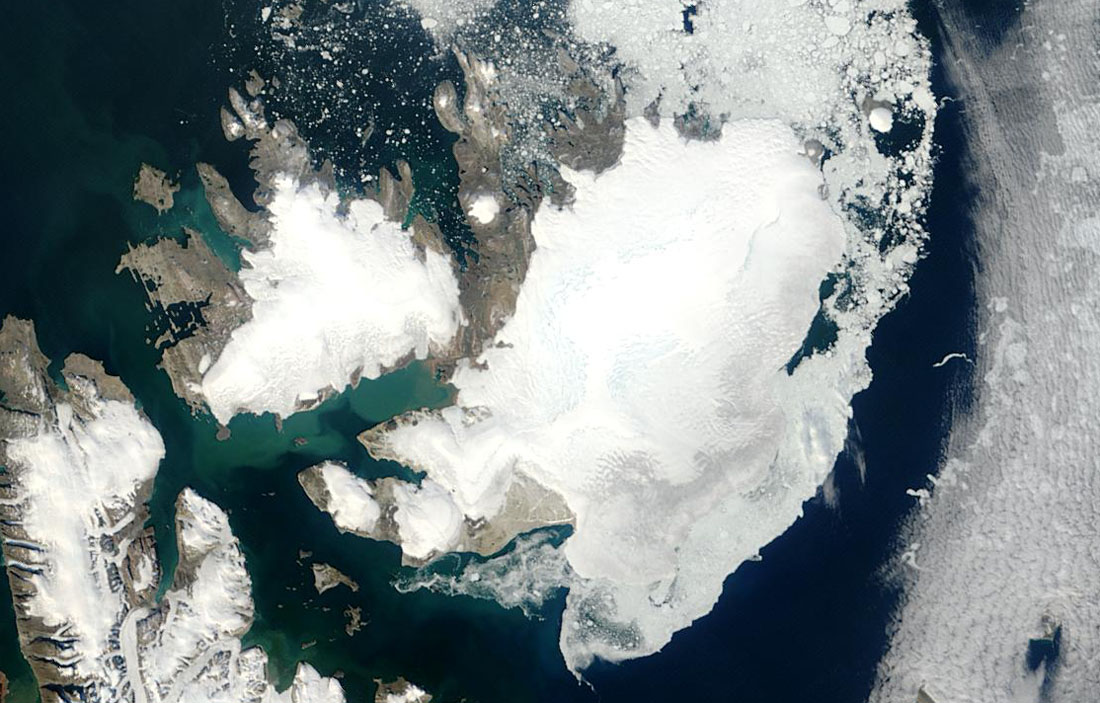
Satellite image of Nordaustlandet, Svalbard

Vestfonna is an ice cap located on the western part Nordaustlandet in the Svalbard archipelago in Norway. The glacier covers an area of about 2,500 km^{2}. It is the third largest ice cap in Svalbard and Norway by area, after Austfonna and Olav V Land.

== See also ==
- List of glaciers
- List of glaciers in Norway
