= Austfonna =

Ice cap located on Nordaustlandet in the Svalbard archipelago in Norway

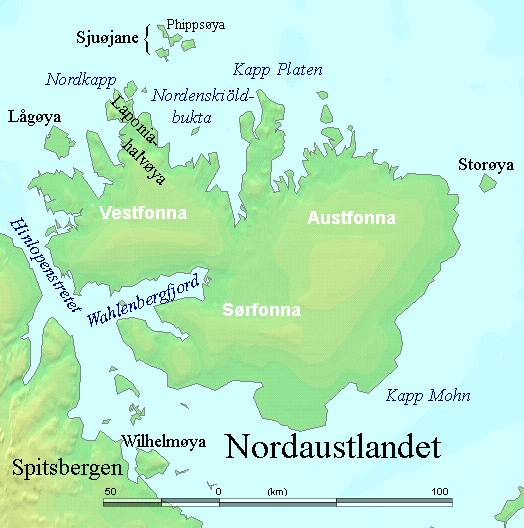
- Austfonna on the island Nordaustlandet. Sørfonna is part of Austfonna, while Vestfonna is a separate glacier.
- Interactive map of Austfonna
- Location: Svalbard, Arctic Ocean, Norway
- Coordinates: 79°47.0′N 24°39.8′E
- Area: 7,800 km^{2} (1,927,000 acres) (including Vegafonna)

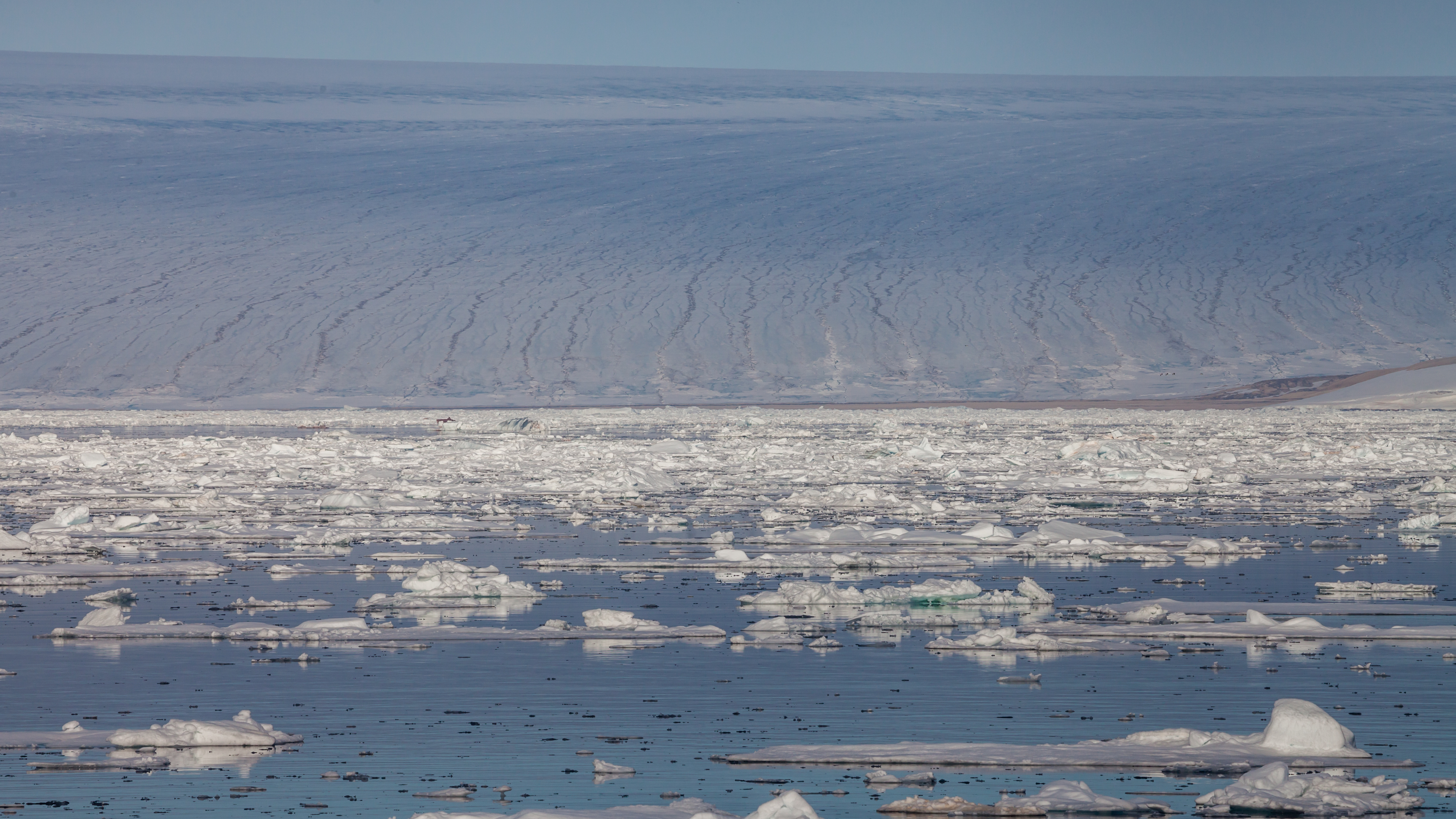
Austfonna glacier seen from Hinlopen strait

Austfonna is an ice cap located on Nordaustlandet in the Svalbard archipelago in Norway. Covering an area of 7,800 km^{2}, it is Europe's third-largest glacier by area and volume, after the Severny Island ice cap of Novaya Zemlya, Russia, and Vatnajökull in Iceland. The combined area of Austfonna and the Vegafonna ice cap is 8,492 km^{2}.

Austfonna has a thickness of up to 560 metres (235 meters average thickness), and is 200 km in circumference. The ice dome reaches an elevation of 783 meters above sea level.

The southern third of Austfonna is sometimes called Sørfonna, which is a separate ice cap, separated from the main part of Austfonna by a long, ice-filled depression, and forming a separate crestal dome.

Vegafonna ice cap in the southwest is also connected to Austfonna proper, specifically to Sørfonna, and is separated from it by Erica Valley. Vegafonna also forms a separate dome. Immediately west of Vegafonna is Glittne ice cap, which is considered part of the former.

Vestfonna in the northwest of the island is a totally separate ice cap (the third largest of Svalbard and Norway).

== See also ==
- List of glaciers in Svalbard
- List of glaciers in Norway
