= Gustav Adolf Land =

Land area of Svalbard, Norway

Coordinates: 79°32′30″N 21°48′40″E

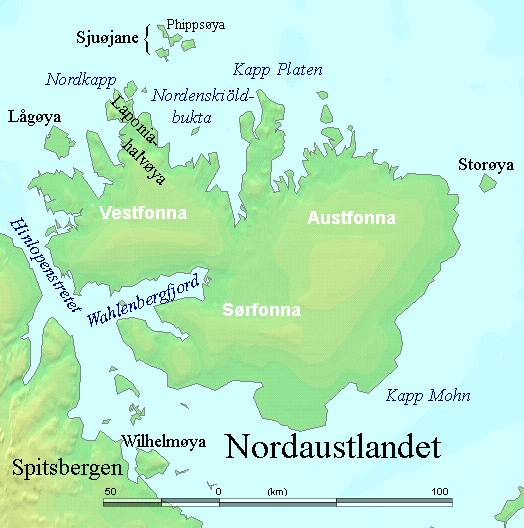
Gustav Adolf Land is located on the southwestern part of Nordaustlandet, Svalbard.

Gustav Adolf Land is the land area of the southwestern part of Nordaustlandet, Svalbard, south of Wahlenbergfjorden. The area is named after Gustaf VI Adolf of Sweden.

== See also ==
- Vegafonna
