= Rijpfjorden =

Fjord at the northern side of Nordaustlandet, Svalbard

Coordinates: 80°12′24″N 22°06′36″E

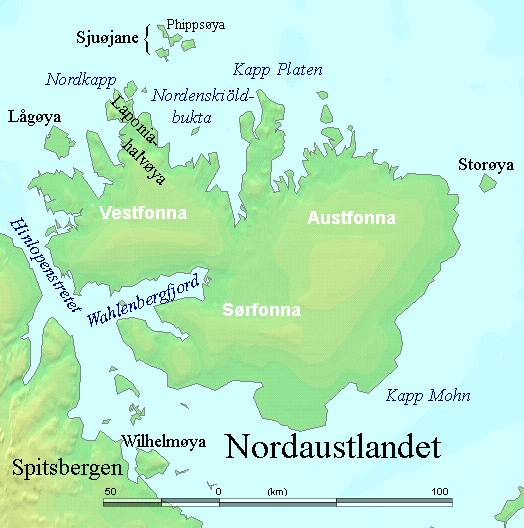
Rijpfjorden is located at the northern side of Nordaustlandet.

Rijpfjorden is a fjord at the northern side of Nordaustlandet, Svalbard. The fjord has a length of about 40 kilometres (25 mi) and a width of about 12 kilometres (7.5 mi). Former names of the fjord include Rypefjorden, Red Currant Bay and Ripsbai. The fjord is named after Dutch explorer Jan Rijp, who never came anywhere near it.
