= Wahlenbergfjorden =

Fjord

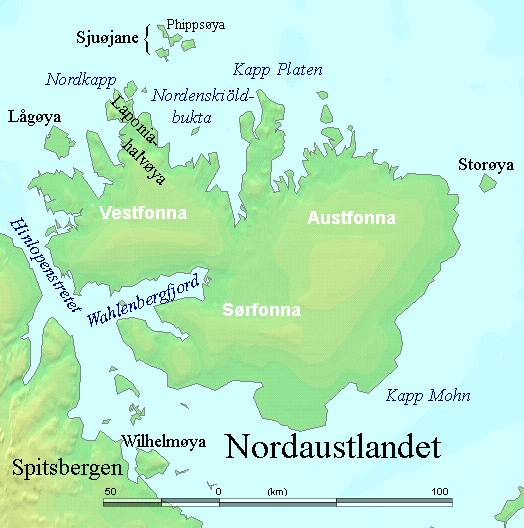
Wahlenbergfjord is in the southwest of Nordaustlandet

Wahlenbergfjorden, sometimes known in English as Waalenburg Bay, is a fjord on the southwest coast of the Arctic island of Nordaustlandet, in Norway's Svalbard archipelago. At 46 kilometres (29 mi) in length, and 15 km (9.3 mi) wide, it is the fifth longest fjord in the archipelago, and the longest on the island. The fjord separates Gustav V Land in the north from Gustav Adolf Land in the south, at geographical co-ordinates 79°40′N 20°00′E. Its mouth faces Spitsbergen across Hinlopen Strait, the strait separating the two islands.

The fjord is named for the Swedish naturalist Göran Wahlenberg (1780-1851) and has been known by this name since at least the early 1930s. The glacier of Wahlenbergbreen in Oscar II Land, Spitsbergen, is also named for him.
