= Hinlopen Strait =

Strait in Svalbard, Norway

Coordinates: 79°37′N 18°47′E

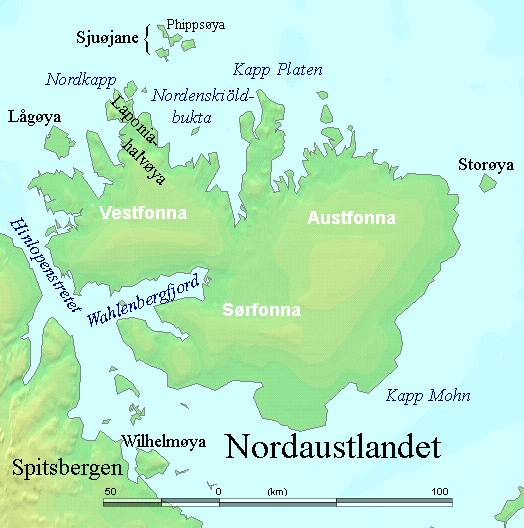
Hinlopen Strait to the left.

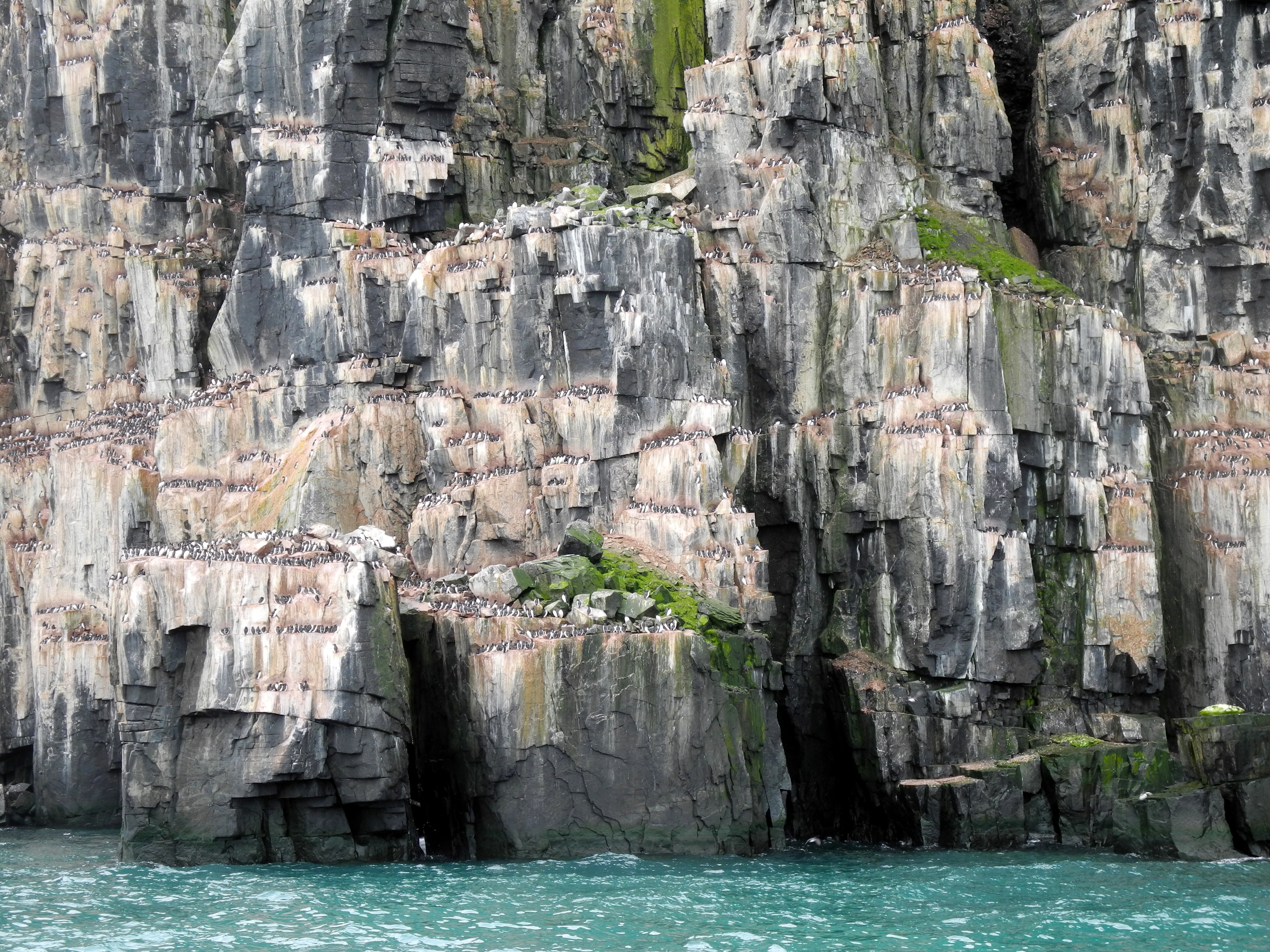
Alkefjellet cliffs in Hinlopen Strait, covered with guillemots.

The Hinlopen Strait (Norwegian: Hinlopenstretet) is the strait between Spitsbergen and Nordaustlandet in Svalbard, Norway. It is 150 kilometers (93 mi) long and 10 to 60 kilometers (6.2 to 37.3 mi) wide. The strait is difficult to pass because of pack ice. It is believed to have been named after Thijmen Jacobsz Hinlopen.

The northern part of the strait is called Nordporten, between Storsteinhalvøya and Mosselhalvøya. The southern part, called Sørporten, widens up between Bråsvellbreen and the Bastian Islands.
