= Nordaustlandet =

Island in the Svalbard archipelago

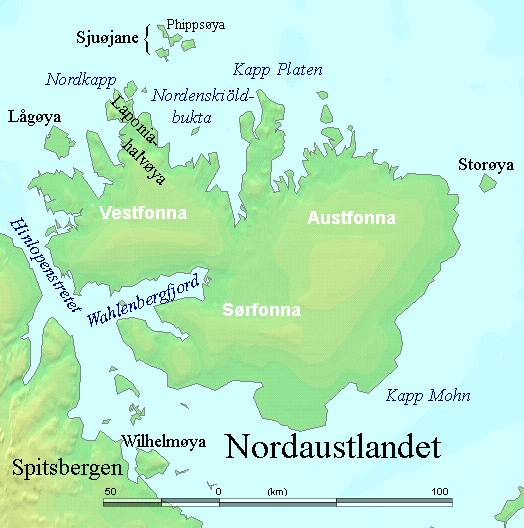

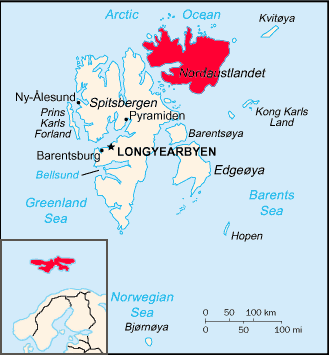

Geography
- Location: Arctic Ocean
- Coordinates: 79°48′N 22°24′E
- Archipelago: Svalbard
- Area: 14,443 km^{2} (5,576 sq mi); 11,009 km^{2} (4,251 sq mi) glaciated
- Area rank: 58th
- Coastline: 1,688 km (1048.9 mi)
- Highest elevation: 764 m (2507 ft)
- Highest point: Snøtoppen

Administration
- Norway

Demographics
- Population: 0

Nordaustlandet (Anglicised as North East Land) is the second-largest island in the archipelago of Svalbard, Norway, with an area of 14,443 square kilometres (5,576 sq mi). It lies north east of Spitsbergen, separated by Hinlopen Strait. Much of Nordaustlandet lies under large ice caps, mainly Austfonna and Vestfonna, the remaining parts of the north being tundra inhabited by reindeer and walruses. The island is uninhabited and lies entirely within Nordaust-Svalbard Nature Reserve.

== History ==
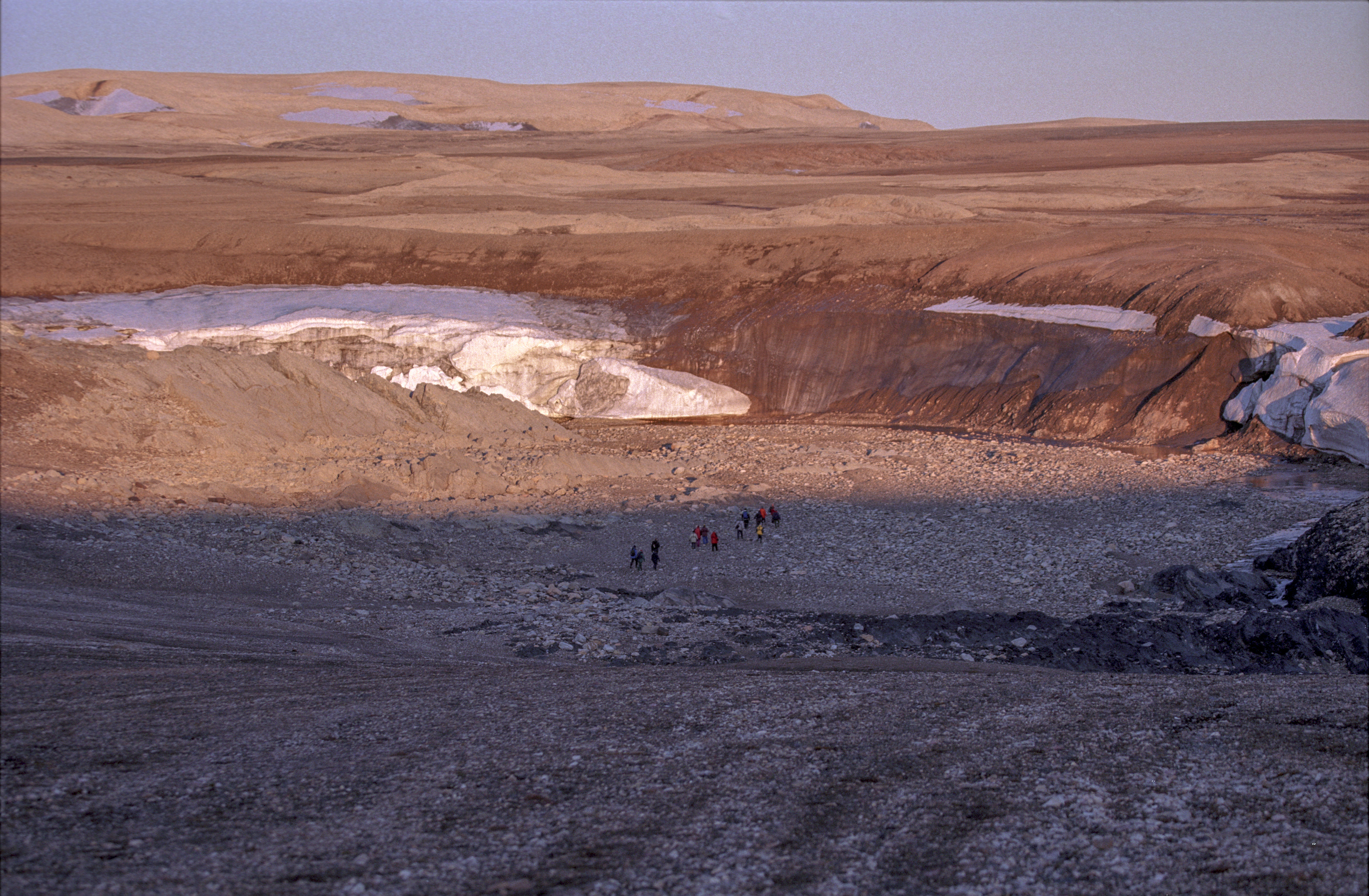
Nordaustlandet is an Arctic desert

English walrus hunters first sighted the south point of Nordaustlandet in 1617. This discovery was shown on the Muscovy Company's map (1625; but based on discoveries made in and prior to 1622), with the island labeled as Sir Thomas Smyth's Iland. It also shows the North Cape (Point Purchas). It is first named Oostlandt ("East Land") on a Dutch 1662 map, and the following year another Dutch map marked its coastline more distinctly, showing its west and north coasts, separating the latter from the Seven Islands (Sjuøyane). A Dutch map of 1710 was the first to show the island accurately, naming it Het Noord Ooster Land ("The North-east Land").

During the German occupation of Norway in World War II, eleven German soldiers were sent to Nordaustlandet in August 1944 to report on the weather. They later learned about the Nazi unconditional surrender via radio and called for transport home, but did not receive any response until months later when Norway sent a whaling ship to rescue them.

== Geology and landscape ==
The rock types in Nordaustlandet stem from many different geological eras. The northern part consists of old crystalline basement, with rocks such as marble, quartzite, mica schist, gneiss and granite. East of Lady Franklinfjorden, on the peninsula Botniahalvøya and east of Duvefjorden there are volcanic rocks. In the east and south of Rijpfjorden the bedrock is made up of distinctive red-coloured granite. The Rijpfjord granite is medium grained, and contains two micas (muscovite and biotite) in addition to quartz, plagioclase and pink K-feldspar. It was emplaced in late Silurian times.

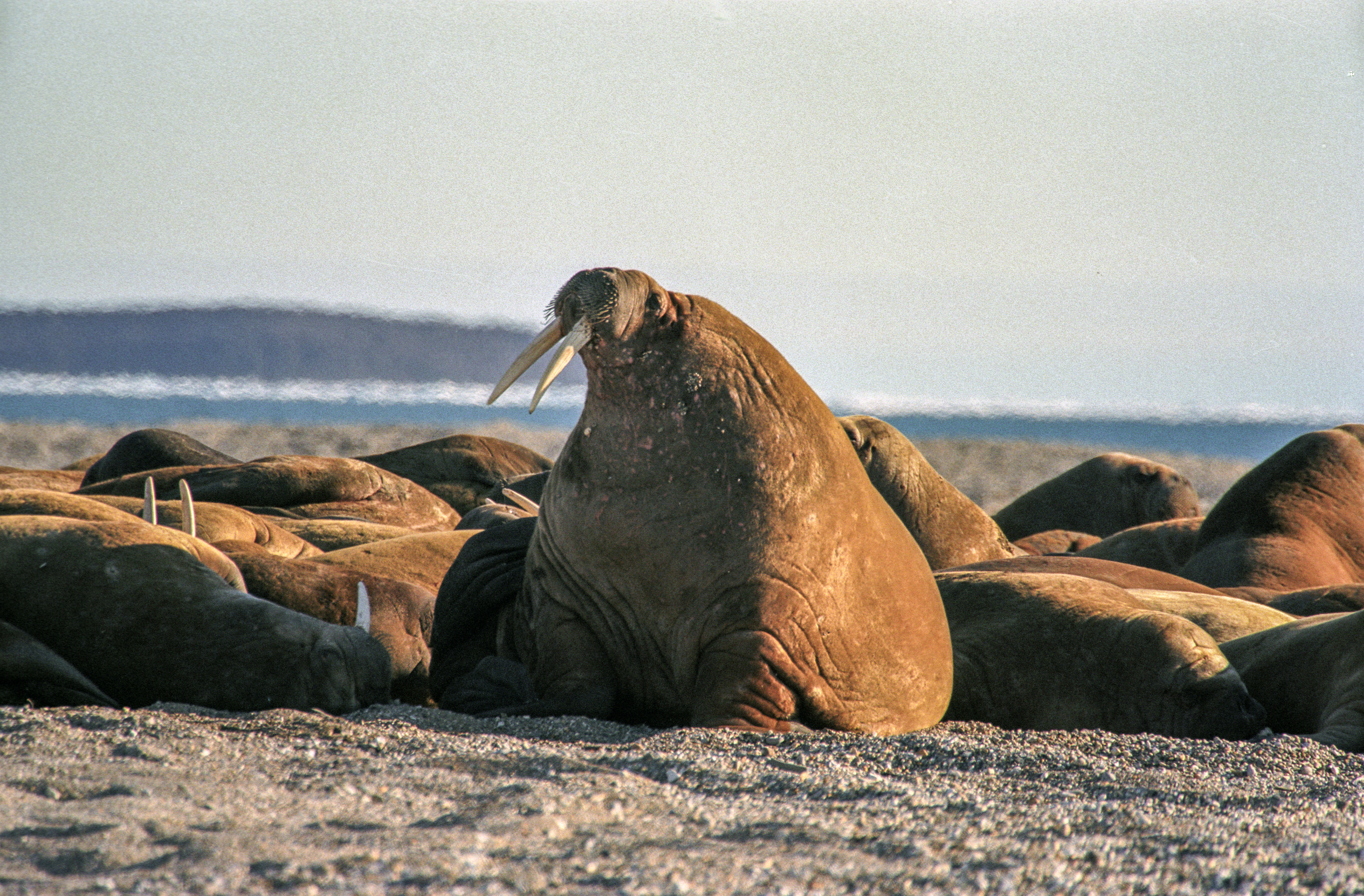
Walrus colony on Nordaustlandet

Layered gabbro and dolerite of Silurian age occur at Kapp Laura in easternmost Nordaustlandet, on the island of Storøya, and in the eastern part of the island of Kvitøya. On Andréeneset, in the southern part of Kvitøya, gneisses and granites are the most common rock types. Four generations of rocks: gneiss, amphibolite, and grey and pink granite are present on Isispynten, a headland east of Austfonna. South of Wahlenbergfjorden there is a large area with sedimentary rocks – mostly limestone and dolomite – from the Carboniferous and Permian. The youngest rocks in Nordaustlandet are Jurassic–Cretaceous dolerite dikes, which intrude the basement rocks on the island of Lågøya and in the outlet of Brennevinsfjorden.

Unconsolidated deposits in Nordaustlandet consist of scree slopes, block fields and raised shore deposits. There are only small amounts of river deposits. The largest strandflats on Nordaustlandet can be found in the north-west, around Murchisonfjorden and on the island of Lågøya. Another large strandflat is Svartknausflya in the south, just west of the glacier of Bråsvellbreen. Here, there are raised shore deposits up to 120 m.a.s.l., where ancient whale bones have been found 70 m (230 ft) above today's sea level. Svartknausflya is also the largest moraine area in Nordaustlandet; it measures about 70 km^{2} (27 sq mi).

Glacial activity has shaped the landscape in Nordaustlandet through several ice ages. Gentle plateaus and rounded mountains are the most common sight. The tallest and steepest mountains, up to 600 m.a.s.l., can be found in the north. The eastern part of Nordaustlandet is covered in glaciers, and there are few areas without ice. Between Vibebukta and Kapp Laura, the steep front of the Austfonna ice cap dominates. The glacier has retracted a bit during recent decades, revealing new areas of dry land on the few headlands that can be found around here (such as Isispynten). Austfonna, including Vegafonna, stretch across an area of 8,450 km^{2} (3,263 sq mi). Austfonna covers approximately 58% of Nordaustlandet. Vestfonna is 2,445 km^{2} (944 sq mi). The largest areas with no ice are between Austfonna and Vestfonna and on the peninsulas in the north and north-west of Nordaustlandet.

The glacier Bråsvellbreen is a branch of Vestfonna. In 1937-1938 it had one of the largest surges ever recorded in Svalbard. The 30 km-wide (19 mi) glacier front moved 20 km (12 mi) forward and into the ocean.

== See also ==
- List of islands of Norway
