= History of ice drilling =

History of drilling through ice sheets and glaciers

Scientific ice drilling began in 1840, when Louis Agassiz attempted to drill through the Unteraargletscher in the Alps. Rotary drills were first used to drill in ice in the 1890s, and thermal drilling, with a heated drillhead, began to be used in the 1940s. Ice coring began in the 1950s, with the International Geophysical Year at the end of the decade bringing increased ice drilling activity. In 1966, the Greenland ice sheet was penetrated for the first time with a 1,388 m hole reaching bedrock, using a combination of thermal and electromechanical drilling. Major projects over the following decades brought cores from deep holes in the Greenland and Antarctic ice sheets.

Hand drilling, using ice augers to retrieve small cores, or small drills using steam or hot water to install ablation stakes, is also common.

== History ==
=== Agassiz ===
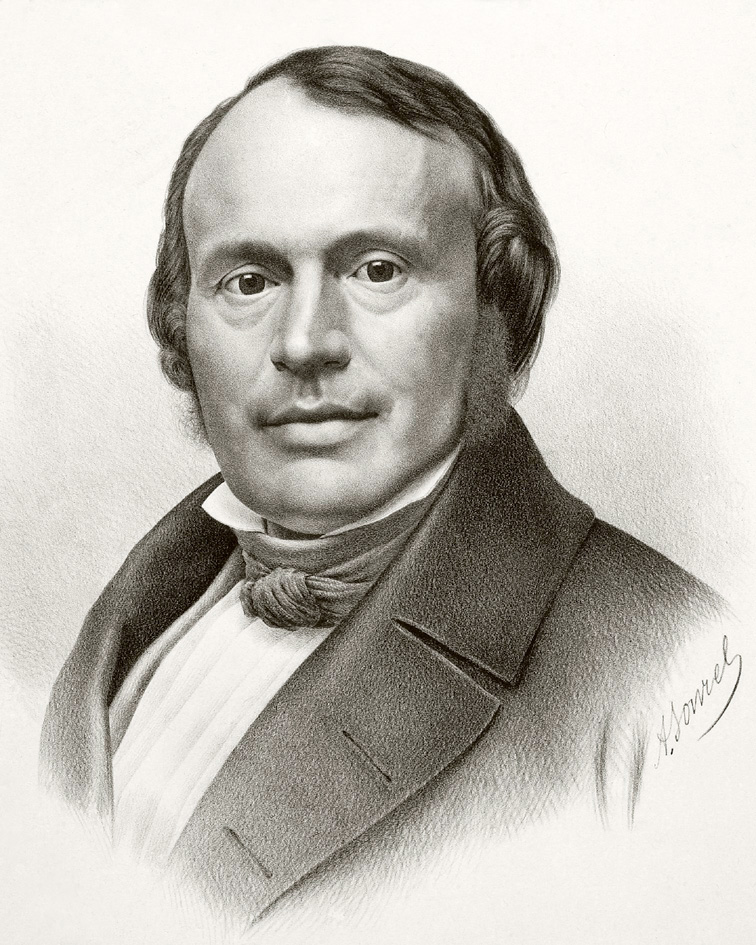
Louis Agassiz

The earliest attempt to drill through ice for scientific reasons was made by Louis Agassiz in 1840, on the Unteraargletscher in the Alps. It was not clear to the scientific community of the day that glaciers flowed, and when Franz Josef Hugi demonstrated that a large boulder on the Unteraargletscher had moved 1315 m between 1827 and 1836, sceptics argued that the boulder might have slid down the glacier. Agassiz visited the glacier in 1839, and returned in the summer of 1840. He planned to make temperature observations on the glacier's interior, and brought an iron drilling rod, 25 feet (7.6 m) long, for that purpose. The first attempt at drilling, in early August, made only 6 inches (15 cm) of progress after several hours work. After heavy rain overnight, the drilling became much faster: a foot (30 cm) of progress was made in less than fifteen minutes, and the hole eventually reached a depth of 20 feet (6.1 m). Another hole drilled nearby reached 8 feet (2.4 m), and more were drilled to place six flow markers in a line across the glacier, which Agassiz hoped would have moved by the following year, demonstrating the flow of the glacier. He believed in the dilatation theory of glacier flow, which argued that the refreezing of meltwater caused glaciers to progressively lengthen; this theory implied that the flow rate should be greatest where the water input was greatest.

Agassiz returned to the Unteraargletscher in August 1841, this time equipped with a drill consisting of 10 iron rods, each 15 feet (4.6 m) long, of the kind used to drill for wells; a longer drill could not have been used by hand, and would have required a scaffold, which would have been too expensive. He was hoping to drill deeply enough to ascertain the thickness of the glacier. Once it was realized that drilling went faster when the holes were full of water, the holes were positioned so that they could be supplied with water by one of the many small streams on the glacier. This had the additional benefit of simplifying the removal of the chips of ice from the bottom of the hole, as they rose to the surface and were carried away by the current. When the first hole reached 70 feet (21 m) the drilling rods became too heavy for the men to use, so a tripod was constructed and a pulley set up so the drill could be raised and lowered by a cable. The tripod took several days to complete, and when the men attempted to begin drilling again they were surprised to discovered the drill would no longer go into the hole, which had closed up to only half an inch across, forcing them to start a new hole. The deepest hole achieved in 1841 was 140 feet (43 m).

The flow markers placed in 1840 were located in 1841 but proved to be uninformative; so much snow had melted that they were all lying flat on the glacier, which made them useless for proving the movement of the ice they had been embedded in. However, a stake set eighteen feet deep in the ice was still embedded, with seven feet projecting above the surface, and ten feet showing by the start of September 1841. Agassiz drilled deeper holes, and planted six stakes in a straight line across the glacier, taking measurements with reference to identifiable points on the surrounding mountains to ensure that he would be able to tell if they had moved.

These flow markers were still in place in July 1842 when Agassiz returned to the Unteraargletscher, and now formed a crescent shape; it was apparent that the ice flowed much faster in the centre of the glacier than at the edges. (Note: The Scottish glaciologist J.D. Forbes, whom Agassiz had invited to the Unteraargletscher in 1841, obtained quicker results from the Mer de Glace the following summer by the use of a theodolite, and published them before Agassiz published his own results, leading to a permanent break in relations between the two men.) Drilling began again on 25 July, again using the cable tool approach. Some problems were encountered: the equipment broke at one point and had to be repaired; and on one occasion it was discovered that the borehole had become distorted overnight, and had to be redrilled. As the hole became deeper, the increasing weight of the drilling equipment forced Agassiz to increase the number of men pulling on the cable to eight; even so they only were able to gain three or four metres a day. While the drilling continued, soundings were taken of moulins and depths of 232 m and nearly 150 m were found. Although Agassiz understood that these measurements were not rigorous, because unseen obstacles might be distorting the readings, he became convinced that it would be impossible for his team to drill to the base of the glacier, and it was decided not to drill below 200 feet (61 m). Additional holes were subsequently drilled to 32.5 m and 16 m to be used for temperature measurements.

=== Late 19th century ===
==== Blümcke and Hess ====
Agassiz's demonstration of the great difficulty of drilling deep holes in glacier ice discouraged other researchers from further efforts in this direction. It was decades before further advances were made in the field, but two patents, the first ice-drilling related ones to be issued, were registered in the United States in the late 19th century: in 1873, W.A. Clark received a patent for his "Improvement in Ice-Augers", which allowed the size of the hole to be specified, and in 1883, R. Fitzgerald patented a hand-powered drill made from a cylinder with cutting blades attached to the bottom.

Between 1891 and 1893 Erich von Drygalski visited west Greenland on two expeditions, and drilled shallow holes there with a spoon-borer: a hollow steel cylinder 75 cm long with a pair of angled blades at the bottom; for holes deeper than 75 cm, additional tubes of the same length could be added. Ice cut by the blades was captured in the cylinder, which would be periodically pulled up to empty out the ice cuttings. The holes were drilled to measure ice movement by placing poles (mostly bamboo) in them and monitoring them. The greatest depth achieved was only 2.25 m, but von Drygalski commented that deeper holes would have been easy to drill; a 1.5 m hole in 0° temperature took about 20 minutes. Von Drygalski took other drill designs, but found the spoon-borer to be the most effective.

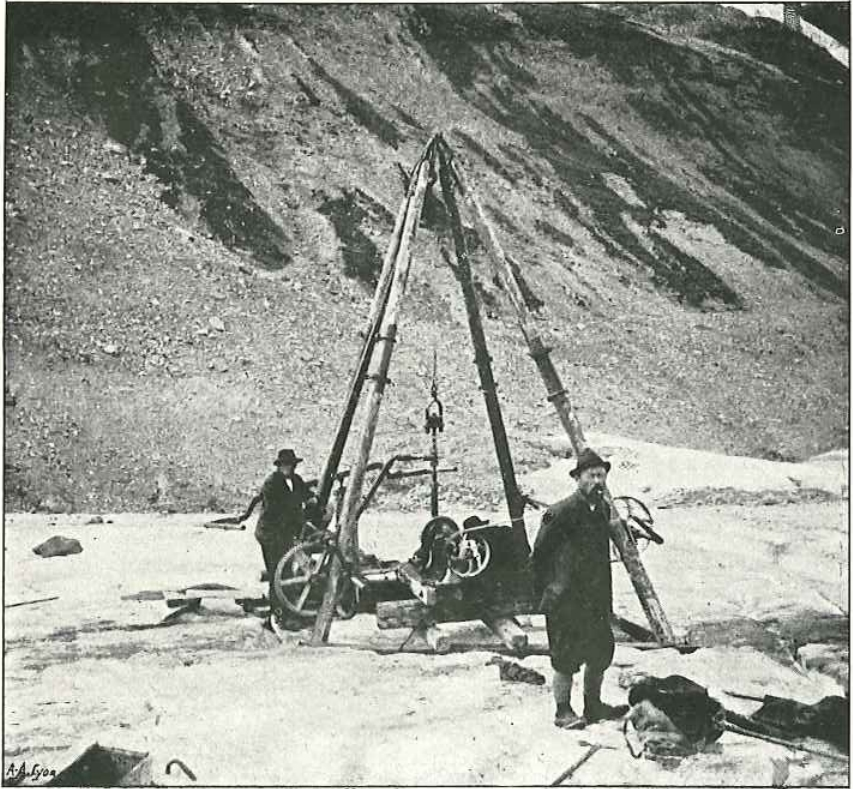
Hans Hess standing in front of an early drilling rig on the Hintereisferner in July 1906

In 1894 Adolf Blümcke and Hans Hess began a series of expeditions to the Hintereisferner. As no ice drilling to any depth had been attempted since Agassiz's expedition, they had no recent examples to learn from, so they experimented in the winter of 1893–1894 with drill designs in the ice cellar of a brewery. From the start they decided against percussion drilling, and they examined one of the drills von Drygalski had taken to Greenland as part of their testing. They also built a copy of von Drygalski's spoon-borer but found it too weak to retain its shape in use. They used a hand crank to rotate the drillbit, which was a helical auger. Their original plan was remove the ice cuttings by bailing, but they almost immediately abandoned this plan; instead, the auger was removed from the borehole at intervals, and a tube inserted to pump water down the hole to carry away the cuttings. This was an entirely new approach, and some trial and error was required to perfect the method. A depth of 40 m was achieved. The following year they modified the auger so water could be pumped down the drillstring itself, emerging from a hole in the auger, and carrying the cuttings back up around the outside of the drill; this eliminated the need to remove the drill to clear the cuttings. Only about seven hours a day could be used for drilling since there was no flowing water on the glacier overnight.

The revised version of Blümcke and Hess's ice auger, used from 1901 on

The drill frequently became wedged in the ice, perhaps because the borehole had deformed, and it was also common to encounter rocks in the ice, which could be identified by rock splinters that were carried up to the surface in the water that cleared the ice cuttings. The most troublesome problem was drilling into voids in the ice. At the bottom of the void a new borehole would be started; if the cavity was such that the water pumped through the drillpipe could flow away from the borehole once it was forced back up around the pipe, then drilling could continue; if not, the cuttings would accumulate around the borehole and eventually further progress would become impossible. Blümcke and Hess attempted to run casing pipe down through the cavity, so that the water and cuttings could continue to come up to the surface, but this was unsuccessful, and would have been too expensive a solution to implement every time the problem occurred.

In 1899 the bed of the glacier was reached in two places, with depths of 66 m and 85 m, and this success persuaded the German and Austrian Alpine Club, which had subsidized the early expeditions, to fund ongoing work and build an improved version of the drilling apparatus, which became available in 1901. A key improvement was adding lateral cutting edges to the auger, enabling it to recut the hole and avoid wedging if it was reinserted into a hole that had become deformed. The equipment weighed 4000 kg, which along with the cost of transport in the high mountains, and the need to employ a large team, made their method expensive, though Blümcke and Hess suggested that their approach would not be too costly for other teams to reproduce. (Note: Mercanton (1905) quotes the cost of the equipment as 3,750 marks, with an additional 1,450 francs for transporting it to the glacier, and wages for the five workers needed to operate it of 52.5 francs per day. Mercanton also quotes the total expenditures of the German and Austrian Alpine Club from 1901 to 1904 on the Hintereisferner expeditions as 16,800 francs.) In a review of Blümcke and Hess's work published in 1905, Paul Mercanton suggested that a petrol engine to power both the rotation of the drill and the water pump would be natural improvements. It had been noticed that the pump work became much more difficult with depth, and up to eight men were needed to continue pumping for the very deepest holes. Mercanton also noticed that whereas Blümcke and Hess's drill required about 60 litres per minute to clear the cuttings, a similar drill he had worked on with Constant Dutoit required only 5% as much water for the same purpose, and he suggested that placing the outflow of water at the very bottom of the drill bit was the key to reducing conflicting water flows around the drill bit and reducing the need for water.

The holes were drilled to verify calculations Blümcke and Hess had made of the glacier's form and expected depth, and the results were in quite good agreement with their expectations. In total Blümcke and Hess completed 11 holes to the glacier bed between 1895 and 1909, and drilled many more holes that did not penetrate the glacier. The deepest hole they drilled was 224 m.

==== Vallot, Dutoit, and Mercanton ====
In 1897, Émile Vallot drilled a 25 m hole in the Mer de Glace, using a 3 m high cable tool with a steel drillbit, which had cross-shaped blades and weighed 7 kg. This proved to be too light to drill effectively, and only 1 m progress was made on the first day. A 20 kg iron rod was added, and progress improved to 2 m per hour. A stick was used to twist the rope above the hole, and as it untwisted it cut a circular hole; the hole diameter was 6 cm. The rope was also pulled back and let fall, so the drill used a combination of percussion and rotational cutting. The drilling site was chosen to be near a small stream, so that the hole could be continuously replenished with water, in order to carry away the fragments of ice released at the bottom of the hole by the drilling process; the ice chips were encouraged to flow up the hole by raising the drillbit higher every ten strokes, for three strokes in a row. The drilling gear was removed from the hole each night to prevent it freezing in place.

When the hole reached 20.5 m, the 20 kg rod was no longer enough to counteract the braking effect of the water in the hole, and progress slowed again to 1 m per hour. A new rod weighing 40 kg was forged in Chamonix, which brought the speed back up to 2.8 m per hour, but at 25 m the drill bit stuck in the hole near the bottom. Vallot poured salt down the hole to try to melt the ice, and lowered a piece of iron to try to knock it loose, but the hole had to be abandoned. Émile Vallot's son, Joseph Vallot, wrote a description of the drilling project and concluded that to be successful, ice drilling should be done as quickly as possible, perhaps in shifts, and that the drill should have cutting edges so that any deformation to the hole would be corrected as the drill was reinserted into the hole, which would avoid the drill bit wedging as happened in this case.

Constant Dutoit and Paul-Louis Mercanton carried out experiments on the Trient Glacier in 1900, in response to a problem posed by the Swiss Society of Natural Sciences in 1899 for their annual Prix Schläfli, a scientific prize. The problem was to determine the internal speed of flow of a glacier by drilling holes in it and inserting rods. Dutoit and Mercanton had not heard of Hess and Blümcke's work but independently came up with a similar design, with water pumped down a hollow iron drillpipe and forced out of a hole in the drill bit to carry ice cuttings back up the hole. After some preliminary testing, they returned to the glacier in September 1900 and achieved a depth of 12 meters with 4 hours of drilling. Their work won them the Prix Schläfli for 1901.

=== Early 20th century ===
By the end of the 19th century, tools were readily available to drill holes of no more than a few metres in glacial ice. Research continued into drilling deeper holes; partly for scientific reasons, such as understanding glacier motion, but also for practical ends. The collapse of the Tête-Rousse Glacier in 1892 had released 200,000 m^{3} of water, killing over 200 people in the resulting flash flood, resulting in research into water pockets in glaciers; and there was also a growing interest in hydroelectric power, which glaciers could supply from the meltwater released each year.

==== Flusin and Bernard ====
In 1900 C. Bernard began drilling at the Tête Rousse Glacier, at the behest of the French Department of Water and Forests. He began by using the percussion approach, with a sharp bevel at the end of an iron tube. 226 m of drilling was done spread across 25 holes, none more than 18 m deep. The following year the same tools were used on an area of hard ice in the glacier, with very slow progress; it took 10 hours to drill an 11.5 m hole. In 1902 the bevel was replaced by a cross-shaped cutting blade on the end of an octagonal bar, and a 16.4 m hole was drilled in 20 hours before further progress became impossible. At this point Bernard became aware of Blümcke and Hess's work, and obtained information from Hess about the design of their drill. In 1903 he started drilling with the new design, but there were defects in its manufacture that prevented any significant progress. The drill was modified during the winter and in 1904 he was able to drill a 32.5 m hole in 28 hours. Several stones were encountered in the hole, and these were broken up by the percussion method before drilling continued. Paul Mougin, the Inspector of Water and Forests at Chambéry, suggested using heated iron bars to drill with: the ends of the bars were heated until incandescent, and dropped into the borehole. Progress of 3 m per hour was obtained by this approach.

George Flusin joined Bernard on Hintereisferner with Blümcke and Hess in 1906, observing the use of their equipment. They noted that the drilling efficiency, which could be as high as 11–12 m/hr in the uppermost 30 m of a hole, gradually diminished with depth, and was much slower at greater depths. This was partly due to the pump, which became less and less efficient in deep holes; this made it harder to clear the hole of ice cuttings.

==== Ice drilling on early expeditions ====
Ice drilling tools used by Erich von Drygalski in 1902, on the Gauss expedition: from left, auger, spoon-borer, drill pipe, and wrench.

Between 1900 and 1902 Axel Hamberg visited glaciers in Swedish Lapland to study snow accumulation and loss, and drilled holes to place measuring rods, which could then be used to determine the change in snow depth in succeeding years. He used a chisel drill, of the kind used for rock drilling, and removed the cuttings from the bottom of the hole by filling the hole with water. To save weight, Hamberg had the drills made of a strong wood such as ash, capped with steel; he reported in 1904 that he had had a drill last for five years, only having to replace the metal that attached the chisel, and some screws. In the hands of someone experienced with the tool, a hole 4 m deep could be drilled in an hour.

A German expedition to the Antarctic, led by von Drygalski, drilled holes in an iceberg in 1902 for taking temperature measurements. They used a hand-cranked auger similar to the one used on the Hintereisferner, attached to steel pipes which could be screwed together. The ice was too hard to use the spoon-borer to drill with, but it was used to remove the ice cuttings once they had accumulated to the point that progress was slowed. Von Drygalski was aware that holes drilled in the Alps had used water to carry away cuttings, but the ice he was drilling was so cold that any water in the hole would have quickly frozen. Multiple holes were drilled, with the deepest reaching 30 m; von Drygalski recorded that it was relatively easy to reach a depth of 15 m, but beyond that point it was much more difficult work. Part of the problem was that as the drill lengthened, with multiple screwed connections, rotating the drill at the top of the hole did not lead to as much rotation at the bottom of the hole.

In 1912, Alfred Wegener and Johan Peter Koch spent the winter on the ice in Greenland. Wegener took a hand auger with him, and drilled a 25 m hole to take temperature readings. Hans Philipp, a German geologist, developed a spoon-borer to take glacier samples, and described the mechanism in a 1920 paper; it had a quick-release mechanism to allow it to be easily emptied. In 1934, during the Norwegian-Swedish Spitsbergen Expedition, Harald Sverdrup and Hans Ahlmann drilled a few holes, none deeper than 15 m. They used a spoon-borer similar to the one described by Philipp, and also took ice cores with a coring drill that resembled a slit piston.

==== Early snow samplers ====
The first snow sampler was created by James E. Church in the winter of 1908–1909, to sample snow on Mount Rose, in the Carson Range in the western US. It consisted of a 1.75 in diameter steel tube with a cutter head attached, and similar systems are still in use in the 21st century. The original cutter head design led to snow being compressed into the body of the sampler, which resulted in a systematic 10% over-estimate of the snow density.

An early improvement was made to Church's snow sampler design in the 1930s by George D. Clyde, who changed the dimensions so that one inch of water inside the tube weighed exactly one ounce; this allowed the user of the sampler to easily determine the depth of water the snow corresponded to by weighing the filled sampler. Clyde's sampler was made of aluminium, rather than steel, reducing its weight by two-thirds. In 1935 the US Soil Conservation Service standardized the form of the snow sampler, modularizing it so that additional sections could be added to sample deep snow. This is now referred to as the "Federal snow sampler".

=== First thermal drills ===
An early thermal drill was operated on the Hosand Glacier and Miage Glacier by Mario Calciati in 1942; it worked by heating the drill bit with hot water, pumped down to it from a wood-burning boiler. Calciati reached the bed of the glacier at 119 m, at a rate of 3 to 4 m per hour. The deepest hole drilled was 125 m. The same process was used later in the decade by Énergie Ouest Suisse to drill fifteen holes to the bed of the Gorner glacier, confirming the depths determined by A. Süsstrunk in 1948 by seismography.

An electrothermal drill was patented in Switzerland in May 1946 by René Koechlin; it worked by electrically heating a liquid inside the drill, which was then circulated to the surface in contact with the ice by a propeller which acted as a pump. The whole mechanism was attached to a cable that both supported the drill and provided the electrical current. The theoretical speed of drilling was 2.1 m/hr. A 1951 paper by Électricité de France engineers reported that Koechlin's drill had been used in Switzerland, but gave no details.

==== Jungfraujoch and Seward Glacier ====
In 1938, Gerald Seligman, Tom Hughes, and Max Perutz visited the Jungfraujoch to take temperature readings; their goal was to study the transition of snow into firn and then into ice with increasing depth. They dug shafts as deep as 20 m by hand, and also bored holes with augers of two different designs, including one based on advice provided by Hans Ahlmann. In 1948 Perutz returned to the Jungfrau, leading a project to investigate glacial flow on the Jungfraufirn. The plan was to drill a hole to the bed of the glacier, place a steel tube in the hole, and then revisit it for the next two years to measure the inclination of the tube at various depths. This would determine how the speed of ice flow varied with depth below the surface of the glacier. General Electric was engaged to design the electrical heating element for the tip of the drill, but were late in delivering it; Perutz had to pick up the package at Victoria Station's left luggage as he was leaving the UK for Switzerland. The package was resting on top of other suitcases in the train onward from Calais, and in pulling down a suitcase Perutz accidentally knocked it out of the train window. One of his team members returned to Calais and organized local Boy Scouts to search the track for the package, but it was never recovered. When Perutz reached the Sphinx Observatory (the research station on the Jungfraujoch) he was advised by the head of the station to contact Edur A.G., a manufacturing firm in Bern; (Note: In Perutz's reminiscences he mentions Bern, although the resulting paper credits "Edur A.G., Zürich" for the equipment.) Edur manufactured electrothermal tools to bore open beer barrels, and were able to quickly fashion a satisfactory drill tip. Perutz returned with the new drill tip to find that his two graduate students, whom he had left learning to ski while he went to Bern, had both broken their legs. He was able to persuade André Roch, who was then at the Institute for Snow and Avalanche Research at Weissfluhjoch, to join the project, and more students were sent from Cambridge as well.

The heating element, formed of three tantalum coils baked into heat-resisting clay, was screwed to the end of the steel tube that was to form the lining of the hole, and a tripod was set up to suspend the drill above the hole. The element generated 2.5 kW at 330 V, and was powered by a cable that ran down the steel tube. It was connected to power at the Sphinx Observatory by a cable laid across the snow. Drilling began in July 1948, and after two weeks the hole was successfully drilled to the bed of the glacier at a depth of 137 m. There were some additional delays: twice the tube had to be hauled back out of the hole—once to remove a dropped spanner, and once because the heating element burned out. Inclinometer readings were taken in August and September 1948, and again in October 1949 and September 1950; the results showed that the borehole was curving forward as time passed, implying that the velocity of the ice decreased from the surface towards the bed.

Also in 1948, the Arctic Institute of North America sponsored an expedition to the Seward Glacier in the Yukon, in Canada, led by Robert P. Sharp. The goal of expedition was to measure the temperature of the glacier at various depths below the surface, and an electrothermal drill was used to create the boreholes where the thermometers were deployed. The holes were punched with aluminium pipe to a depth of no more than 25 ft, and below that depth the drill was used. The drill bit was an electrical hot point, with current carried by a heavy cable down through the drill pipe; the other conductor was the drill pipe itself. The drill design proved effective, and the deepest hole achieved was 204 ft; Sharp considered that it would have been easy to drill much deeper holes if necessary. The expedition returned to the glacier in 1949 with the same equipment, drilling further holes, with a maximum depth of 72 ft.

==== Other early thermal drills and the first ice cores ====
The Expédition Polaires Françaises (EPF) sent several expeditions to Greenland in the late 1940s and early 1950s. In 1949 they became the first team to recover an ice core; a thermal drill was used, at Camp IV, to drill a 50 m hole to obtain an 8 cm diameter ice core. The following year more cores were drilled in Greenland, at Camp VI, Milcent, and Station Centrale; a thermal drill was used for three of these.

An electrothermal drill was deployed in the Alps in 1949 by Xavier Ract-Madoux and L. Reynaud, who were surveying the Mer de Glace for Électricité de France to determine if it could be used as a source of hydroelectric power. Experiments in 1944 had demonstrated that using explosives to clear tunnels through the ice was ineffective; some passages to the interior of the glacier were opened by digging, but these closed within days due to the pressure and plasticity of the ice, which overwhelmed any attempt to brace the tunnels open with wood. In the summer of 1949 Ract-Madoux and Reynaud returned to the glacier with a thermal drill consisting of a 1 m long resistor wound in a cone shape, with a maximum diameter of 50 mm. This was suspended from a cable via a tripod over the borehole, and was able to drill 24 m in an hour under ideal conditions.

In the summer of 1951 Robert Sharp of the California Institute of Technology duplicated Perutz's glacial flow experiment, using a thermal drill with a hotpoint tip, on the Malaspina Glacier in Alaska. The hole was cased with an aluminium pipe; the glacier at that point was 595 m thick, but the hole stopped at 305 m because the hotpoint stopped working. That same summer a thermal drill based on Calciati's design was built by Peter Kasser at the Institute of Hydraulic Engineering and Earthworks at the Zurich Technische Hochschule (ETH Zurich). The drill was designed to help in setting stakes in the glaciers to measure ablation rates; some Alpine glaciers lose up to 15 m of ice in a single year, so the holes needed to be about 30 m deep to embed stakes that could last long enough to be useful. A boiler heated water to over 80 °C, and a pump circulated it through pipes to a metal drill tip, and then back up to the boiler. Ethylene glycol was used as an antifreeze additive to reduce the risk of the cooled water freezing before it returned to the boiler. The drill was first tested on the Aletsch Glacier in 1951, where 180 m of holes were drilled at an average speed of 13 m/hr, and subsequently used extensively in the Alps. In 1958 and 1959 it was used in Western Greenland on the International Glaciological Greenland Expedition (EGIG), part of the International Geophysical Year.

A series of attempts was made to drill holes in Saskatchewan Glacier and case them with aluminium pipe, for inclinometer studies. The drill was an electrical hotpoint. Three holes were attempted in 1952; all were abandoned, at depths of 85 to 155 ft, when either equipment failed, or the hotpoint ceased to be able to penetrate further. A hole of 395 ft depth was lost the following year, with one factor being ice movement compressing the hole; in 1954 a two more holes were given up at 238 ft and 290 ft. Three sets of casing were placed: in the deepest 1952 hole, and the two 1954 holes. One of the 1954 pipes was lost to water leakage, but measurements were taken of the other pipes; the 1952 pipe was resurveyed in 1954.

=== 1950s ===
==== FEL, ACFEL, SIPRE, and the SIPRE auger ====
The US Army's Corps of Engineers greatly expanded its activities in Alaska during World War II, and several internal organizations came into being to address the problems they encountered. A soils laboratory, which investigated frost problems with runways, was established in Boston as part of the Corps' New England Division; it was made into a separate entity in the mid-1940s, called the Frost Effects Laboratory (FEL). A separate Permafrost Division, based in St. Paul, Minnesota, was established in January 1945. At the request of the US Navy's Division of Oceanography, FEL began ice mechanics testing in 1948 with the intention of creating a portable kit that could be used for drilling and coring ice and measuring ice properties in the field. The Navy envisaged the kit being light enough to carry in a small plane which could land on ice, so that the kit could be deployed quickly and easily. The result was the Ice Mechanics Test Kit, described by FEL in a 1950 paper, which was used in the field by the Navy and also by some scientific researchers. The kit included an auger able to produce 3-inch-diameter cores. The FEL researchers found that the base of the core barrel had to be tapered slightly so that the cuttings would move to the outside of the core barrel, where they could be carried up the auger flights; without this, the cuttings would accumulate inside the core barrel, around the core, and block further progress. The same study also evaluated non-coring auger designs, and determined that a clearance angle of 20° produced a good cutting action with little downward force required. Both thick and thin cutting edges were found to be effective. It was found that in very cold conditions, the ice cuttings would fall back out of the auger as it was removed from the hole, impeding progress, so a small baffle was added near the cutting edge: the cuttings could move up past it, but could not fall back down across it. When it was discovered that the non-coring auger tended to bend easily, and jam in the hole, but that the coring auger did not suffer from this problem, development of the non-coring auger ceased, and the final test kit only included the coring auger.

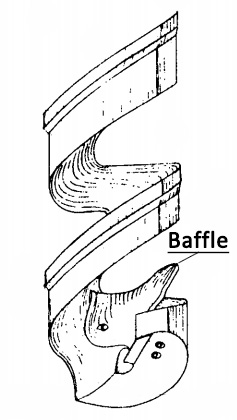
ACFEL non-coring auger with baffle to stop cuttings falling out of the flights.

Meanwhile, in 1949, another Army organization concerned with snow and ice was established: the Snow, Ice and Permafrost Research Establishment (SIPRE). SIPRE was based in Washington at first, but soon relocated to St. Paul, and then in 1951 to Wilmette, Illinois, just outside Chicago. In 1953 FEL was merged with the Permafrost division to form the Arctic Construction and Frost Effects Laboratory (ACFEL). In the 1950s SIPRE produced a modified version of the ACFEL auger; (Note: Rand & Mellor assert that the auger was developed in 1955–1956 in preparation for the coming International Geophysical Year, but according to Talalay the auger was tested as early as 1952.) this version is generally known as the SIPRE auger. It was tested on ice island T-3 in the Arctic, which was occupied by Canadian and US research staff for much of the period from 1952 to 1955. The SIPRE auger has remained in wide use ever since, despite the later development of other augers that addressed weaknesses in the SIPRE design. The auger produces cores up to about 0.6 m; longer runs are possible, but lead to excess cuttings accumulating above the barrel, which risks jamming the auger in the hole when it is extracted. It was originally designed to be hand-operated, but has often been used with motor drives. Five 1 m extension rods were provided with the standard auger kit; more could be added as needed for deeper holes.

==== Early rotary drilling and more ice cores ====
The use of conventional rotary drilling rigs to drill in ice began in 1950, with several expeditions using this drilling approach that year. The EPF drilled holes of 126 m and 151 m, at Camp VI and Station Centrale respectively, with a rotary rig, with no drilling fluid; cores were retrieved from both holes. A hole 30 m deep was drilled by a one-ton plunger which produced a hole 0.8 m in diameter, which allowed a man to be lowered into the hole to study the stratigraphy.

Augers used by Ract-Madoux and Reynaud in 1950 on the Mer de Glace

Ract-Madoux and Reynaud's thermal drilling on the Mer de Glace in 1949 was interrupted by crevasses, moraines, or air pockets, so when the expedition returned to the glacier in 1950 they switched to mechanical drilling, with a motor-driven rotary drill using an auger as the drillbit, and completed a 114 m hole, before reaching the bed of the glacier at four separate locations, the deepest of which was 284 m—a record depth at that time. The augers were similar in form to Blümcke and Hess's auger from the early part of the century, and Ract-Madoux and Reynaud made several modifications to the design over the course of their expedition. Attempts to switch to different drillbits to penetrate moraine material they encountered were unsuccessful, and a new hole was begun instead in these cases. As with Blümcke and Hess, an air gap that did not allow the water to clear the ice cuttings was fatal to drilling, and usually led to the borehole being abandoned. In some cases it was possible to clear a plug of ice by injecting hot water into the hole. On the night of 27 August 1950 a mudflow covered the drilling site, burying the equipment; it took the team eight days to free the equipment and start drilling again.

An expedition to Baffin Island in 1950, led by P.D. Baird of the Arctic Institute, used both thermal and rotary drilling; the thermal drill was equipped with two different methods of heating an aluminium tip—one a commercially supplied heating unit, and the other designed for the purpose. A depth of 70 ft was reached after some experimentation with different approaches. The rotary drilling gear included a saw-toothed coring bit, with spiral slots intended to aid the passage of ice cuttings back up the hole. The cores were retrieved frozen into the steel coring tube, and were extracted by briefly warming the tube in the exhaust gases from the rotary drill engine.

In April and May 1950 the Norwegian–British–Swedish Antarctic Expedition used a rotary drill with no drilling fluid to drill holes for temperature measurement on the Quar Ice Shelf, to a maximum depth of 45 m. In July drilling to obtain a deep ice core was begun; progress stopped at 50 m at the end of August because of seasonal conditions. The hole was extended to 100 m when drilling resumed. It was found that the standard mineral drillbit jammed with ice very easily, so every other tooth was ground away, which improved the performance. Obtaining the ice cores added a great deal to the time required for drilling: a typical drilling run would require about an hour of lowering the drill string into the hole, pausing after each drill pipe was lowered to screw another pipe onto the top of the string; then a few minutes of drilling; and then one or more hours of pulling the string back out, unscrewing each drill pipe in turn. The cores were extremely difficult to retrieve from the core barrel, and were very poor quality, consisting of ice chips.

In 1950 Maynard Miller took rotary drilling equipment weighing over 7 tons to the Taku glacier, and drilled multiple holes, both to investigate glacial flow by placing an aluminium tube in a borehole and measuring the inclination of the tube with depth over time, as Perutz's team had done on the Jungfraufirn, and also to measure temperature and retrieve ice cores, mostly from 150–292 ft deep. Miller used water to flush cuttings from the hole, but also tested drilling efficiency in a dry hole and with various different auger bits. In 1952 and 1953 Miller used a hand drill on the Taku glacier to drill cores down to a few metres in depth; this was a toothed drill with no flights to remove the cuttings, a design that has been found to be low efficiency, as the cuttings interfere with the continued drilling action of the teeth.

In 1956 and 1957 the US Army Corps of Engineers used a rotary rig to drill for ice cores at Site 2 in Greenland, as part of their Greenland Research and Development Program. The drill was set up at the bottom of a 4.5 m trench, with an 11.5 m mast to allow the use of 6 m pipes and core barrels. An air compressor was set up to clear the ice cuttings by air circulation; it produced air that could be as hot as 120 °C, so to prevent the hole walls and the ice core from melting, a heat exchanger was set up that brought the air down to 12 °C of the ambient temperature. The cores recovered were in reasonably good condition, with about 50% of the cored depth yielding unbroken cores. At 296 m it was decided to drill without coring in order to reach a greater depth more quickly (since non-coring drilling did not require slow roundtrips to remove the cores), and to start coring again once the hole reached 450 m. A tricone bit was used for the non-coring drilling, but it soon became stuck and could not be released. The hole was abandoned at 305 m. The following summer a new hole was begun in the same trench, again using air circulation to clear cuttings. Vibration of the drill bit and core barrel caused the cores to shatter during drilling, so a heavy drill collar was added to the drillstring, just above the core barrel, which improved core quality. At 305 m depth coring was stopped and the hole was continued to 406.5 m, with two more cores retrieved at 352 m and 401 m.

Another SIPRE project, this time in combination with the IGY, used a rotary rig identical to the rig used at Site 2 to drill at Byrd Station in West Antarctica. Drilling lasted from 16 December 1957 to 26 January 1958, with casing down to 35 m and cores retrieved down to 309 m. The total weight of all the drilling equipment was nearly 46 t. In February 1958 the equipment was moved to Little America V, where it was used to drill a 254.2 m hole in the Ross Ice Shelf, a few metres short of the bottom of the shelf. Air circulation was again used to clear the cuttings for most of the hole, but for the last few metres diesel fuel was used to balance the pressure of the seawater and circulate the cuttings. Near the bottom seawater began to leak into the hole. The final open hole depth was only 221 m because ice cuttings from reaming the hole feel to the bottom and formed a slush plug which could not be cleared before the end of the season.

Setting ablation stakes might require hundreds of holes to be drilled; and if short stakes are used, the holes may have to be periodically redrilled. In the 1950s percussion drilling was still used for some projects; a mass-balance study on the Hintereisferner in 1952 and 1953 began with a chisel drill to drill the stake holes, but obtained a toothed drill from LMU Munich's geophysics staff which enabled them to drill 1.5 m in 10 to 15 minutes.

In the summers of 1958 and 1959, the Institute of Geography of the Soviet Academy of Sciences (IGAS) sent an expedition to Franz Josef Land in the Russian Arctic. Drilling was done with a conventional rotary rig, using air circulation. Several holes were drilled, from 20–82 m deep, in the Churlyenis ice cap; cores were recovered in runs of 1 m to 1.5 m, but they were usually broken into lengths of 0.2 m to 0.8 m. Several times the drill became stuck when condensation from the air circulation froze on the borehole walls. The drill was freed by tipping 3–5 kg of table salt down the hole and waiting; the drill came free in 2–10 hrs.

==== Hot water drills ====
In 1955 Électricité de France returned to the Mer de Glace to do additional surveying, this time using lances that could spray hot water. Multiple holes were drilling to the base of the glacier; the lances were also used to clear entire tunnels under the ice, with the equipment adapted to spray the hot water through seventeen nozzles simultaneously.

==== Development of electrothermal drills ====
A team from Cambridge University excavated a tunnel under the Odinsbre ice fall in Norway in 1955, intending to lay a 128 m pipe along the tunnel, with the intention of using inclinometer readings from within the pipe to determine details of the icefall motion over time. The pipe was delivered late, and was not in time to be used in the tunnel, which closed unexpectedly quickly, so in 1956 a thermal drill was used to drill a hole for the pipe. The drill had a 5 in diameter head, with the meltwater flowing to the outside of the drillhead rather than being drained through a hole. The drillhead was cone-shaped, which maximized the time the meltwater spent flowing over the ice, thus increasing the heat transfer to the ice. It also increased the metal surface for heat transfer. Since electrothermal drills were known to be at risk of fusing when they encountered dirt or rocky material, a thermostat was incorporated into the design. The sheath of the drill head was separable, in order to make it quicker to replace the heating element if necessary. Both the sheath and the heating element were cast into aluminium; copper was considered, but eliminated from consideration because the copper oxide film which would be quickly formed once the drill was in use would significantly reduce heat transfer efficiency. In the laboratory the drill performed at 93% efficiency, but in the field it was found that the pipe joints were not waterproof; water seeping into the pipe was continuously boiled by the heater, and the rate of penetration was halved. The drill was set up on a slope of the ice fall that was at 24° from horizontal; the borehole was perpendicular to the ice surface. The penetration rate periodically slowed for a while but could be recovered by moving the pipe up and down or rotating it; it was speculated that debris in the ice would reduce the rate of penetration, and pipe movement encouraged the debris to flow away from the drill head face. Bedrock was reached at a depth of 129 ft; it was assumed to be bedrock once 14 hours of drilling led to no additional progress in the borehole. As with the tunnel, subsequent expeditions were not able to find the hole; it was later discovered that the nature of the icefall was such that ice in that part of the icefall becomes buried by additional ice falling from above.

A large copper deposit under the Salmon Glacier, in Alaska, led a mining company, Granduc Mines, to drill exploratory holes in 1956. W.H. Mathews, of the University of British Columbia, persuaded the company to allow the holes to be cased so they could be surveyed. A thermal drill was used since the drill site could only be accessed in winter and spring, and water would not have been easily available. A total of six holes were drilled; one, at 323 m, failed to reach bedrock, but the others, from 495 m to 756 m, all penetrated the glacier. The hotpoint was allowed to rest at the bottom of the hole for an hour at a time with slack in the cable; each hour the remaining slack would be pulled up and the progress measured. This led to a hole too crooked to continue, and subsequently a 20 ft length of pipe was attached to the hotpoint, which kept the borehole much straighter, although it was still found that the borehole tended to stray further and further away from the vertical once it began to deviate. The 495 m hole was the one cased with the aluminum pipe. Inclinometer measurements were taken in May and August 1956; a visit to the glacier in the summer of 1957 found that the pipe had become plugged with ice, and no further readings could be taken.

Between 1957 and 1962 six holes were bored in the Blue Glacier by Ronald Shreve and R.P. Sharp from Caltech, using an electro-thermal drill design. The drill head was attached to the bottom of aluminium pipe, and when drilling was completed the cable down the pipe was broken at a low strength joint, leaving the drill at the bottom of the hole, resulting in a hole cased with the pipe. The pipes were surveyed with an inclinometer both when drilled and in following years. The pipes were frequently found to be plugged with ice when surveyed, so a small hotpoint was designed that could be lowered inside the pipe to thaw the ice so that inclinometer readings could be taken. Kamb and Shreve subsequently drilled additional holes in Blue Glacier for tracking vertical deformation, suspending a steel cable in the hole instead of casing it with pipe. In following years, in order to take inclinometer readings, they redrilled the hole with a thermal drill design that followed the cable. This approach allowed finer resolution of the details of the deformation than was possible with a pipe.

In the early 1950s Henri Bader, then at the University of Minnesota, became interested in the possibility of using thermal drilling to obtain cores from holes thousands of metres deep. Lyle Hansen advised him that high voltage would be needed to prevent power loss, and this meant a transformer would need to be designed for the drill, and Bader hired an electrical engineer to develop the design. It lay unused until in 1958, with both Bader and Hansen working at SIPRE, Bader obtained an NSF grant to develop a thermal coring drill. Fred Pollack was hired as a consultant to work on the project, and Herb Ueda, who joined SIPRE in late 1958, joined Pollack's team. The original transformer design was used in the new drill, which included a 10 ft long core barrel, weighed 900 lbs, and was 30 ft long. It was tested from July to September 1959 in Greenland, at Camp Tuto, near Thule Air Base, but only drilled a total of 89 inches in three months. Pollack left when the team returned from Greenland, and Ueda took over as the team lead.

In 1958 the Cambridge team which had placed a pipe in the Odinsbre icefall in 1956 returned to Norway, this time to place a pipe in the Austerdalsbre glacier. A defect of the Odinsbre drill was the wasted heat spent on water that collected in the pipe; it was thought impracticable to prevent water from entering the pipe, so the new design included an airtight chamber behind the heating element to separate it from any water that might collect. As before, a thermostat was included. The drill operated entirely successfully, with an average rate of penetration just under 6 m/hr. When the hole reached 397 m, drilling stopped, since this was the length of the available pipe, although bedrock had not been reached. The following summer two more holes were drilled on the Austerdalsbre, using drills adapted from the previous year. The new drill heads were 3.2 inches and 3.38 inches in diameter, and the designs were similar: a sheath allowed easier replacement of the element, and a thermostat was included. 32.5 ft of aluminium tube was attached behind the drill head, with metal discs of 3.2 inches diameter screwed on at the midpoint and upper end. This succeeded in keeping the borehole straight. The 3.2 in drill was used to a depth of 460 ft, at which point water leakage damaged the drill head. The 3.38 in drill took the hole to 516 ft, but progress became extremely slow, probably because of debris in the ice, and the hole was abandoned. A second hole was started with the 3.38 in drill and this successfully reached bedrock at 327 ft, but the thermostat failed, and after some difficulty the drill was removed from the hole to find that the aluminium casting had melted, and the lower part of the drill head remained in the hole.

A Canadian expedition to the Athabaska Glacier in the Canadian Rockies in the summer of 1959 tested three thermal drills. The design was based on R.L. Shreve's drill design, and used a commercial heating element originally intended for electric cookers. Three of these hotpoints were acquired; two were cut to 19-ohm lengths, and one to a 16-ohm length. They were wound into helices, and cast in copper, before being assembled into a form that could be used for drilling. The drill was made from pipe with an outside diameter of 2 in, and was 48 in long. The maximum design temperature for the heater's steel sheath was 1,500 °F; since it was determined that the normal operating temperature would be well below this, power was increased to over 36 watts per inch.

The 16-ohm drill burned out at 60 ft depth; it was found to have overheated. One of the 19-ohm drills failed at one of the soldered junctions of the drill with the cable leading to the surface. The other drilled two holes, to 650 ft and 1024 ft, reaching a maximum drilling rate of 11.6 m/hr. The efficiency of the drill was about 87% (with 100% efficiency defined as the rate obtained when all the power goes into melting the ice). In addition, two other hotpoint drills were assembled in the field, to a different design. A total of five holes were drilled; the other two holes reached 250 ft and 750 ft.

=== 1960s ===
The Federal snow sampler was refined in the early 1960s by C. Rosen, who designed a version which consistently produced more accurate estimates of snow density than the Federal sampler. Larger-diameter samplers produce more precise results, and samplers with inner diameters of 65 to 70 mm have been found to be free of the over-measurement problems of the narrower samplers, though they are not practical for samples over about 1.5 m.

A European collaboration between the Italian Comitato Nazionale per l'Energia Nucleare, the European Atomic Energy Community, and the Centre National de Recherches Polaires de Belgique sent an expedition to Princess Ragnhild Coast, in Antarctica in 1961, using a rotary rig with air circulation. The equipment performed well in tests on the Glacier du Géant in the Alps in October 1960, but when drilling began in Antarctica in January 1961, progress was slow and the cores recovered were broken and partly melted. After five days the hole had only reached 17 m. The difficulties appear to have been caused by the loss of air circulation into the firn layer. A new hole was begun, using the SIPRE auger as the drillhead; this worked much better, and in four days a depth of 44 m was reached with almost complete core recovery. Casing was set to 43 m, and drilling continued with air circulation, with a toothed drill, and ridges welded to the sides of the core barrel to increase the space around the barrel for air circulation. Drilling was successful to 79 m, and then the cores became heavily fractured. The core barrel became stuck at 116 m and was abandoned, ending drilling for the season.

Edward LaChapelle of the University of Washington began a drilling program on the Blue Glacier in 1960. A thermal drill was developed using a silicon carbide heating element; it was tested in 1961, and used in 1962 to drill twenty holes on the Blue Glacier. Six were abandoned when the borehole encountered cavities in the ice, and five were abandoned because of technical difficulties; in three cases the drill was lost. The remaining holes were continued until non-ice material was reached, in most cases this was presumed to be bedrock, though in some cases the drill may have been stopped by debris in the ice. The silicon carbide element (taken from a standard electric furnace heater) was in direct contact with the water. The drill was constructed to allow rapid heating element replacement in the field, which proved to be necessary as the heating elements deteriorated quickly at the negative terminal when running under water; typically only 5–8 m could be drilled before the element had to be replaced. Drilling speed was 5.5 to 6 m/hr. The deepest hole drilled was 142 m.

Another thermal drill was used in 1962 on the Blue Glacier, this time able to take cores, designed by a team from Caltech and the University of California. The design goal was to enable glaciologists to obtain cores from deeper holes than could be drilled with augers such as the one designed by SIPRE, with equipment sufficiently portable to be practical in the field. A thermal drill was considered simpler than an electromechanical drill, and made it easier to record the orientation of the cores; thermal drills were also known to perform well in water-saturated temperate ice. The drill reached the bed of the glacier in September 1962 at a depth of 137 m at a rate of about 1.2 m/hr; it obtained a total of sixteen cores, and was used in alternation with a non-coring thermal drill which was able to drill 8 m/hr.

The first percussion drilling rig designed specifically for ice drilling was tested in 1963 in the Caucasus Mountains by the Soviet Institute of Geography. The rig used a hammer to drive a tube into the ice, typically gaining a few centimetres with each blow. The deepest hole achieved was 40 m. A modified rig was tested in 1966 on the Karabatkak Glacier, in Terskei Alatau in what was then the Kirghiz SSR, and a 49 m hole was drilled. Another cable-tool percussion rig was tested that year in the Caucasus, on the Bezengi Glacier, with one hole reaching 150 m. In 1969, a US cable tool using both percussion and electrothermal drilling was used on the Blue Glacier in Washington; the thermal bit was used until it became ineffective, and then percussion was tried, though it was found to be only marginally effective, particularly in ice near the base of the glacier, which included rocky debris. In Greenland in 1966 and 1967 attempts were made to use rotary-percussion drilling to drill in ice, both vertically and horizontally, but again the results were disappointing, with slow penetration, particularly in the vertical holes.

A rotary drilling rig, using seawater as the circulating fluid, was tested at McMurdo Station in the Antarctic in 1967, with both an open face bit and a coring bit. Both bits performed well, and the seawater was effective at removing the cuttings. The drill tests were conducted by the US Navy Civil Engineering Laboratory, and were intended to establish suitable methods for construction work in polar regions.

==== Steam drills ====
A study of the Hintereisferner in the early 1960s required placing stakes in hand-drilled holes to measure ice loss. Since up to 7 m per year of ice could be lost, the holes sometimes had to be redrilled partway through the year. To avoid this, a hand-operated steam drill was developed by F. Howorka. Two hoses were used, one inside the other, to reduce heat loss, and a 2 m long guide tube was attached to the inner hose at the end, in order to keep the borehole straight. A brass rod was used as the drill tip; the inner hose ran through the tube and rod and a nozzle was attached at the end of the rod. The drill was able to drill an 8 m hole in 30 minutes; one butane cartridge lasted about 110 minutes, allowing three holes to be drilled.

A hand-held steam drill for placing ablation stakes was designed by Steven Hodge at the end of the 1960s. A Norwegian steam drill based on Howorka's 1965 design had been obtained by the Glacier Project Office of the Water Resources Division of the US Geological Survey to plant stakes on the South Cascades Glacier in Washington; Hodge borrowed the drill to install ablation stakes on the Nisqually Glacier, but found that it was too fragile, and also too unwieldy to be brought to the glacier by backpack. Hodge's design used propane, and took the form of an aluminium box, with the propane tank at the bottom and the boiler above it. A chimney could be extended from the drill to improve ventilation, and a side opening vented the burner gases. As with Howorka's design, an inner and outer hose were used for insulation purposes. Tests revealed that a simple forward hole in the nozzle did not give the most efficient results; additional holes were made in the nozzle to spread the spray evenly across the surface of the ice. Two copies of the drill were built; one was used on the South Cascades Glacier in 1969 and 1970 and on the Gulkana and Wolverine Glaciers in Alaska in 1970; the other was used by Hodge on the Nisqually Glacier in 1969, on sea ice at Barrow, Alaska in 1970, and on the Blue Glacier in 1970. Typical drilling rates were 0.55 m/min, with a drill diameter of 1 inch. A 2-inch-diameter nozzle was tested; it drilled at 0.15 m/min. It was effective in ice with sand and rock inclusions. In Arctic conditions, with air temperatures below −35 °C, it was found that the steam would cool to water and form an ice plug before reaching the drill tip, but this could be avoided by running the drill indoors to warm up the equipment first.

==== SIPRE and CRREL thermal drilling ====
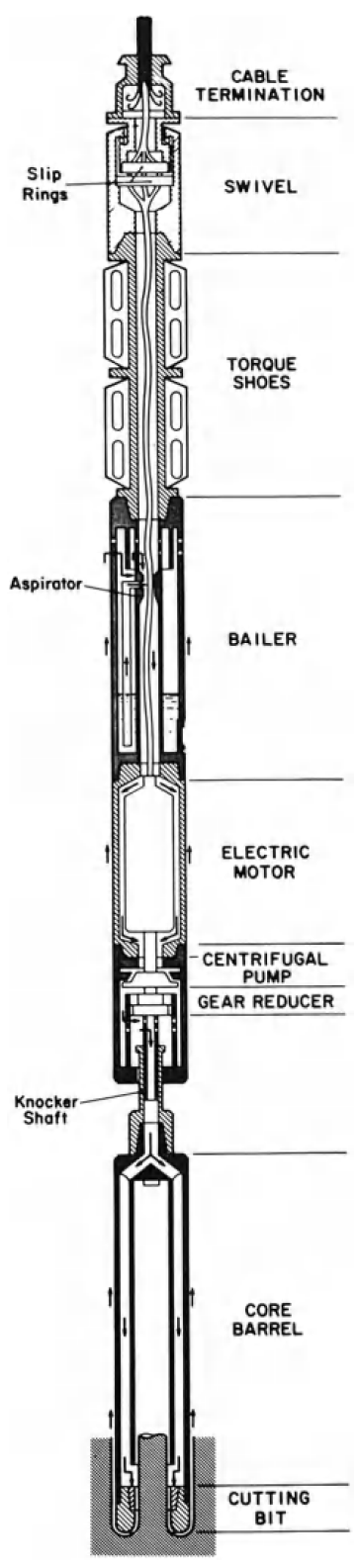
Electromechanical drill used by CRREL in the 1960s. Arrows show the direction of flow of the drilling fluid.

In 1961 ACFEL and SIPRE were combined to form a new organization, the Cold Regions Research and Engineering Laboratory (CRREL). Some minor modifications were subsequently made to the SIPRE auger by CRREL staff, so the auger was also sometimes known as the CRREL auger.

The SIPRE thermal drilling project returned to Camp Tuto in 1960, achieving about 40 ft of penetration with the revised drill. The project moved to Camp Century from August to December 1960, returning in 1961, when they managed to reach over 535 feet, at which point the drill became stuck. In 1962 unsuccessful attempts were made to retrieve the drill, so a new hole was begun, which reached 750 feet. The hole was abandoned when part of the drill was lost. In 1963 the thermal drill reached about 800 feet, and the hole was extended to 1755 ft in 1964. To prevent hole closure, a mixture of diesel fuel and trichloroethylene was used as a drilling fluid.

Continual problems with the thermal drill forced CRREL to abandon it in favour of an electromechanical drill below 1755 ft. It was difficult to remove the meltwater from the hole, and this in turn reduced the heat transfer from the annular heating element. There were problems with breakage of the electrical conductors in the armoured suspension cable, and with leaks in the hydraulic winch system. The drilling fluid caused the most serious difficulty: it was a strong solvent, and removed a rust inhibiting compound used on the cable. The residue of this compound settled to the bottom of the hole, impeding melting, and clogged the pump that removed the meltwater.

To continue drilling at Camp Century, CRREL used a cable-suspended electromechanical drill. The first drill of this type had been designed for mineral drilling by Armais Arutunoff; it was tested in 1947 in Oklahoma, but did not perform well. CRREL bought a reconditioned unit from Arutunoff in 1963 for $10,000,. and brought it to the CRREL offices in Hanover, New Hampshire. It was modified for drilling in ice, and taken to Camp Century for the 1964 season. The drill didn't need an antitorque device; the armoured cable was formed of two cables each twisted in opposite directions, so if the cable began to twist it provided its own antitorque. To remove the cuttings, ethylene glycol was added to the hole with each trip; this dissolved the ice chips and the bailer, with diluted ethylene glycol, was emptied on each return to the surface. Drilling continued for the next two years, and in June 1966 the EM drill extended the hole to the bottom of the icecap at 1387 m, drilling through a silty band at 1370 m depth, and then extending the hole below the ice to 1391 m. The subglacial material included a mixture of rocks and frozen till, and was about 50–60% ice. Inclinometer measurements were taken, and when the hole was excavated and reopened in 1988, new inclinometer measurements enabled the speed of the ice flow at different depths to be determined. The bottom 229 m of the ice, dating from the Wisconsin glaciation, was found to be moving five times as fast as the ice above it, indicating that the older ice was much softer than the ice above.

In 1963, CRREL built a shallow thermal coring drill for the Canadian Department of Mines and Technical Surveys. The drill was used by W.S.B. Paterson to drill on the ice cap on Meighen Island in 1965, and Paterson's feedback led to two revised versions of the drill built in 1966 for the Australian National Antarctic Research Expedition (ANARE) and the US Antarctic Research Program. The drill was designed to be used in both temperate glaciers and colder polar regions; drilling rates in temperate ice were as high as 2.3 m/hr, down to 1.9 m/hr in ice at 28 °C. The drill was able to obtain a 1.5 m core in a single run, with a chamber above the core barrel to hold the melt water produced by the drill. In the 1967–1968 Antarctic drilling season, CRREL drilled five holes with this design; four to a depth of 57 m, and one to 335 m. The cores were shattered between 100 m and 130 m, and of poor quality below that, with numerous horizontal fractures spaced about 1 cm apart.

A difficulty with cable-suspended drilling is that since the drill must rest on the bottom of the borehole with some weight for the drilling method—thermal or mechanical—to be effective, there is a tendency for the drill to lean to one side, leading to a hole that deviates from the vertical. Two solutions to this problem were proposed in the mid-1960s by Haldor Aamot of CRREL. One approach, conceived in 1964, was based on the idea that a pendulum will natural return to a vertical position, because the centre of gravity is below the point at which it is supported. The design has a hot point at the bottom of the drill with a given diameter; higher up the drill, at a point above the centre of gravity, there is a hotpoint built as an annular ring around the body of the drill. In operation the upper hotpoint, being wider than the lower one, rests on the edge of the borehole formed by the lower hotpoint, and gradually melts it. The relative power supplied to the two hotpoints controls the ratio of weight resting at each point. A test version of the drill was built at CRREL with a 4 in diameter, and was found to quickly return the borehole to vertical when started in a deliberate inclined hole. Aamot also developed a drill that resolved the problem by taking advantage of the fact that thermal drills operate immersed in the water that they melt. He added a long section above the hotpoint that was buoyant in wanter, providing a force towards the vertical whenever the drill was fully immersed. Five of these drills were built and tested in the field in August 1967; hole depths ranged from 10 m to 62 m. All the drills were lost to hole closure, since the ice was thought to be a few degrees below zero; the use of an antifreeze additive to the borehole was considered but not tried.

A third approach to the issue was suggested by Karl Philberth for use in thermal probes, which penetrate ice as a thermal drill does, paying out a cable behind them, but which allow the ice to freeze behind them, since the goal is to place a probe deep in the ice without expecting to retrieve it. For probes intended for very cold ice, the side walls of the probe are also heated, to prevent the probe from freezing in place, and in these cases additional vertical stabilization is needed. Philberth suggested using a horizontal layer of mercury just above the hot point; if the probe tilted away from the vertical, the mercury would flow to the lowest side of the drill, providing heat transfer from the hotpoint only to that side, and speeding up the heating on that side, which would tend to reverse the tilt of the borehole. The approach was successfully tested in the laboratory for short runs of the probes.

In December 1967, drilling began at Byrd Station in Antarctica; as at Camp Century, the hole was begun with the CRREL thermal drill, but as soon as the casing was set, at 88 m, the electromechanical drill took over. The hole was extended to 227 m in the 1967–1968 drilling season. The team returned to the ice in October, and the drill was operated round-the-clock, reaching a depth of 770 m by 30 November. After the hole reached 330 m, it showed a persistent and increasing deviation from the vertical, which the team were unable to reverse. By the end of 1968 the hole was at 11° from the vertical. Drilling continued to the bottom of the icecap, which was reached at the end of January at 2164 m, at which point the inclination was 15°. Cores were recovered from the whole length of the borehole, and were of good quality, although cores from between 400 m and 900 m was brittle. It was found impossible to get a sample of the material below the ice; repeated attempts were eventually abandoned for fear of losing the drill. The following season further attempts were made, but the drill became stuck and the wireline had to be severed, abandoning the drill. Inclinometer measurements in the hole over the next 20 years revealed that there was more deformation in the ice below 1200 m depth, corresponding to the Wisconsin glaciation, than above that point.

=== 1970s ===
==== JARE projects ====
Japan began sending research expeditions to the Antarctic in 1956; the overall research program, Japanese Antarctic Research Expedition (JARE) named each year's expedition with a numeral starting with JARE 1. Drilling projects were not included in any of the expeditions until over a decade later, partly because Japan had no research station in Antarctica. In May 1965 a group of glaciologists proposed a program for the expeditions from 1968 through 1972 that included some drilling; but because of resource constraints JARE decided to defer the drilling program to 1971, with JARE 11 establishing a depot at Mizuho in 1970. In preparation two drills were designed and built. JARE 140, designed by Yosio Suzuki, was based on blueprints of the CRREL thermal drill, though difficulties with obtaining materials led to multiple changes in the design. The other, designed by T. Kimura, the head of the JARE 12 drilling team, was the first electromechanical auger drill ever built. JARE XI set up a depot at Mizuho in July 1970, and in October 1971 JARE XII began drilling with the new electrodrill. It proved to have many problems; the auger fins did not effectively move the chips upward to the upper half of the core barrel where they were to be stored, and as there was no outer barrel surrounding the auger, the chips frequently clogged the space between the drill and the borehole wall, overloading the motor, sometimes after only 20 or 30 cm of progress. The drill was also somewhat underpowered at 100 W. It became stuck at 39 m depth, and attempts to retrieve it led to the loss of the drill when the cable detached from the clamp on the drill. The thermal drill, JARE 140, was used to drill 71 m that November, but was also lost in the hole. The following year, JARE XIII took a thermal drill, JARE 140 Mk II; plans for taking a new electrodrill had to be given up as it had proved impossible to find a suitable gear reduction mechanism to address the power issue. The 140 Mk II reached 105 m on 14 September 1972, and then stuck; it was freed by pouring 60 litres of antifreeze in the hole. The pump was damaged; it was replaced and drilling was restarted in November, reaching 148 m by November 14, at which point the drill stuck once again and was abandoned. The problems with these drills, caused partly by the low temperatures of the season, led the JARE planners to decide to drill later in the austral summer, and do additional field testing before drilling in Antarctica again.

An Icelandic team drilling for cores on Vatnajökull glacier in 1968 and 1969, using a thermal drill, found they were unable to penetrate below 108 m, probably because of a thick ash layer in the glacier. They were also concerned about the possibility of meltwater from the thermal corer contaminating the isotopic ratio of the core they retrieved at shallower depths. They designed two drills to address these concerns. One was the SIPRE coring auger, with an electrical motor attached at the top of the hole; this extended the depth the auger was effective at from 5 m to 20 m. The other new design was a simplification of the CRREL cable-suspended drill. It had helical flights to carry the ice chips to a storage compartment above the core barrel, and was designed to run submerged in water, since the previous years' experience had found water in the hole from 34 m. The drill was used in the summer of 1972 on Vatnajökull glacier, and penetrated the ash layers without difficulty, but problems were encountered with the drill sticking at the end of the run, probably because of ice chips freezing in the gap between the hole wall and the drill barrel. The drill was freed by applying tension to the cable in these cases, and to limit the problem each run was begun with a bag of isopropyl alcohol tied inside the core; the bag burst when drilling began, and the alcohol, mixing with water in the hole, acted as an antifreeze. Drilling stopped at 298 m when the cable became damaged; a new cable, 425 m long, was obtained from CRREL, but this only allowed the hole to reach 415 m, which was not deep enough to reach the bed of the glacier.

JARE returned to the field in 1973 with a new electromechanical auger drill (Type 300) built by Yosio Suzuki, of Hokkaido University's Institute of Low Temperature Science, and a thermal drill (JARE 160). Since Nagoya University was planning to obtain ice cores on ice island T-3, the drills were tested there, in September, and obtained multiple cores with 250 mm diameter using the thermal drill. The electrodrill was modified to address issues found during test drilling, and two revised versions of the thermal drill (JARE 160A and 160B) were built as well, for use in the 1974–1975 Antarctic drilling season.

In 1977 JARE approached Yosio Suzuki, who had been involved with JARE drilling in the early 1970s, and asked him to design a method of placing 1.5m^{3} of dynamite below 50 m in the Antarctic ice sheet, in order to perform some seismic surveys. Suzuki designed two drills, ID-140 and ID-140A, to drill holes with 140 mm diameter, intended to reach 150 m in depth. The most unusual feature of these drills was their anti-torque mechanism, which consisted of a spiral gear system that transferred rotary motion to small cutting bits that cut vertical grooves in the borehole wall. Fins in the drill above these side cutters fit into the grooves, preventing rotation of the drill. The only difference between the two models was the direction of rotation of the side cutters: in ID-140 the cutting edge of the bits cut upwards into the borehole wall; in ID-140A the edge cut downwards. Testing these drills in a cold laboratory in late 1978 revealed that the outer barrel was not perfectly straight; the deviation was large enough to make it impossible to drill without a heavy load. The jacket was replaced with a machined steel jacket, but further testing made it clear that the auger was ineffective at transporting the chips upwards. A third jacket, rolled from a thin steel sheet, was made, and the drill was sent to Antarctica with JARE XX for the 1978–1979 drilling season; this jacket was too weak and was crushed in the first drilling run, so the second jacket had to be used. Despite the poor cuttings clearance, a 63 m deep hole was drilled, but at that depth the drill became stuck in the hole when the anti-torque fins lost alignment with the grooves cut for them. In 1979 Kazuyuko Shiraishi was appointed to lead the JARE 21 drilling program, and worked with Suzuki to build and test a new drill, ILTS-140, to try to improve the chip transportation. The barrel for the test drill was made of a pipe formed from a sheet of steel, and this immediately solved the problem: the seam formed by the joining of the sheet's edges acted as a rib to drive the cuttings up the auger flights. In retrospect it was apparent to Suzuki and Shiraishi that the third jacket built for ID-140 would have solved the problem had it been strong enough, as it also had a lengthwise seam.

==== Shallow drill development ====
In 1970, in response to a perceived need for new equipment for shallow and intermediate core drilling, three development projects were begun at CRREL, the University of Copenhagen, and the University of Bern. The resulting drills became known as the Rand drill, the Rufli drill, and the University of Copenhagen (or UCPH) drill. The Rand and Rufli drills became the model for further development of shallow drills, and drills based on their design are sometimes referred to as Rufli-Rand drills.

In the early 1970s a shallow auger drill was developed by John Rand of CRREL; it is sometimes known as the Rand drill. It was designed for coring in firn and ice up to 100 m, and was first tested in 1973 in Greenland, at Milcent, during the GISP summer field season. Testing led to revisions to the motor and anti-torque system, and in the 1974 GISP field season the revised drill was tested again at Crête, in Greenland. A 100 m core was obtained in good condition, and the drill was then shipped to Antarctica, where two more 100 m cores were obtained in November of that year, at the South Pole and then at J-9 on the Ross Ice Shelf. The cores from J-9 were of poorer quality, and only about half the core was recovered at J-9 below 75 m. The drill was used extensively in Antarctica over the next few years, until after the 1980–1981 austral summer season. After that date the PICO 4 in drill took over as the drill of choice for US projects.

Another drill based on the SIPRE coring auger design was developed at the Physics Institute at the University of Bern in the 1970s; the drill has become known as the "Rufli drill", after its principal designer, Henri Rufli. As with the Icelandic drill, the goal was to build a powered drill capable of extending the SIPRE auger's range; the goal was to drill quickly to 50 m with a lightweight drill that could be quickly and easily transported to drillsites. The core barrel in the final design resembled the SIPRE coring auger, but was 2 m longer; the combined weight of this section and the motor and antitorque sections above it was only 150 kg, with the heaviest single component weighing only 50 kg. It retrieved cores between 70 cm and 90 cm in length, with the ice chips captured by holes in the sides of the barrel above the core. The system was initially tested in 1973, at Dye 2, in Greenland; the winch was not yet completed, and there were problems with the coring section, so the SIPRE auger was substituted for the duration of the test. A 24 m hole was drilled with this equipment. In February 1974 a new version of the core barrel was tested on the Jungfraujoch by hand-driving it into the snow, and in March all components except for the electric winch were tested on Plaine Morte, in the Alps. That summer the drill was taken to Greenland, and drilled holes at Summit (19 m), Crête (23 m and 50 m), and Dye 2 (25 m and 45 m).

Another auger drill was built at the University of Bern shortly after the Rufli drill was tested; the UB-II drill was heavier than the Rufli drill, with a total weight of 350 kg. (Note: The name "UB-II" has been given to it by Talalay in his survey of drill designs, to distinguish it from the drills designed at the University of Bern. Towards the end of its career it was known as the "NSF-Swiss Drill".) It was used in Greenland in 1975 to drill four cores, at Dye 3 (where the deepest hole, at 94 m, was drilled), South Dome, and on the Hans Tausen Ice Cap. Two more cores were recovered at Colle Gnifetti in the Alps in 1976 and 1977, and the drill returned to Greenland the following year, coring to 46 m and 92 m at Camp III. It was used again in the Alps, on Vernagtferner, in March–April 1979, where three boreholes were drilled, with a maximum depth of 83 m. The drill was then taken to the Soviet station at Vostok, and a team from PICO drilled two holes of 100 m and 102 m.

The Ross Ice Shelf Project, which began in 1973, used a wireline drill in 1976 to attempt to drill four holes on the Shelf, starting in October. They had repeated problems with the overshot (the tool lowered on the wireline to retrieve and replace the core barrel); it accidentally released three times before being lowered to the bottom of the hole. After the third incident, the team switched to openhole drilling down to 147 m before switching to a new hole, using the CRREL thermal drill. This hole was drilled to 330 m before it closed and trapped the drillbit. The team had believed that an open hole could be drilled to this depth without closing, but decided after the loss of the drill that future attempts would have to be made with fluid in the hole to balance the pressure of the ice. In January 1977 another wireline drill system was used to drill to 171 m by the time the drilling season ended, using a drilling fluid consisting of arctic diesel fuel mixed with trichlorethylene when the hole reached 100 m.

Two drills were developed at the University of Copenhagen in the late 1970s. One was a shallow auger drill, developed as part of the Danish involvement in the Greenland Ice Sheet Project (GISP). This drill, known as the UCPH shallow drill, had a total weight of 300 kg, and could be packed on a single sledge. It could be operated by a single person, with another person logging and packing the cores. It was first tested in May 1976 at Dye 3, in Greenland, and then at the Hans Tausen Ice Cap, where the drill was lost. A new version was built for the 1977 season, and it proved to be an effective design, with 629 m of core retrieved, from a maximum depth of 110 m. By the end of the 1977 drilling season a 100 m hole could be drilled in 10 hours. The core quality was excellent. At 110 m the drill stuck for several hours, and was freed by pouring glycol down the hole. The design was modified in the 1980s to address some minor issues, and since then the UCPH shallow drill has been used frequently in Greenland, reaching a depth of 325 m in 1988. The drill can also be used for reaming, with a special device attached to the drive unit instead of the core barrel.

The other 1970s University of Copenhagen drill was designed in 1977, and named "ISTUK", from "is", the Danish word for ice, and "tuk", the Greenlander word for drill. The downhole motor was driven by a battery pack, and the cable that connected the drill to the surface continued to charge the battery during winching operations. Since drilling time was typically only six minutes, whereas a full trip might take an hour, this meant that the cable only needed to supply the average power consumption of the battery, and this in turn reduced the cable dimensions by a factor of 10: the cable used was 6.4 mm in diameter, and was designed to be able to power the motor at a depth of 3300 m. The drill head contained three cutting knives, with a channel above each one, and included three pistons that, as the drill rotated, gradually extended upwards inside the drill, sucking the drilling fluid and the ice cuttings up the channels to a storage area. Although the drill had three core catchers, placed around the barrel, it was found that using just two of them was more effective at breaking away the core at the end of a drilling run, because of the asymmetrical stress this created. A microprocessor in the drill monitored the battery, the inclinometer, and other equipment, and sent a signal up to the surface via the cable.

The Laboratoire de Glaciologie et Géophysique de l'Environnement (LGGE) in Grenoble, France, built a shallow EM drill, built in 1976–1977, based on information provided by John Rand and Henri Rufli, and building on their experience earlier in the decade. The first version of the drill used an inner core barrel similar to the SIPRE hand auger; this was later replaced by an inner barrel with steel, rather than polyethylene, auger flights. It was first used at Dome C, in Antarctica, drilling a 140 m hole in the 1977–1978 season and a 180 m hole the following season. Four more holes were drilled with it in the early 1980s in Antarctica, with the deepest, on Adelie Land, reaching 203 m in the 1980–1981 season. The drill never became stuck in the hole, but it had problems with breaking the core, and the core quality was generally poor below the firn level, with some cores broken completely into wafers or disks of ice. An analysis of the reasons for the poor quality was inconclusive: the causes considered were the cutter geometry (since small modifications to the cutters often improved core quality for a time), inherent physical properties of the ice, ice chips compressed between the barrel and the wall transmitting torque to the core, and vibrations in the drill.

==== Steam drills ====
In the early 1970s LGGE refined earlier steam drilling designs, and created a steam drill able to drill to over 30 m depth. The total weight of the equipment, including fuel for several hours of drilling, was 28 kg—light enough to be easily carried to a drill site. The first steam drills used double walled hoses, but LGGE found this allowed substantial heat loss, and replaced the outer hose with thermal insulation. Drilling speed was 30–40 m/h for the first 10 m, and less after that.

=== 1980s ===
At the end of the 1970s, LGGE designed an EM drill for deep coring, re-using the termination and anti-torque design of their shallow drill. Chips were removed from the drilling fluid via a centrifuge. It was tested in Adelie Land in 1981–1982, but the core catchers failed to work properly and no cores could be retrieved. A comparison of the performance of this drill with LGGE's thermal drill concluded that the thermal drill could be adapted for drilling to 3,500 m, and that the EM drill might also be successfully used for deep drilling, but additional field tests would be needed. In the event LGGE terminated further development because of logistical and financial constraints.

The Polar Ice Core Office (PICO) at the University of Nebraska, in Lincoln, designed a lightweight auger in the 1970s that became known as the PICO auger. To reduce weight, composite materials were used for the drill extensions, which weigh about 1 kg/m. Initially the extensions were screwed together, but this slowed down trip time, and a later version substituted aluminium pins. Testing began in 1980 and holes up to 45 m deep were drilled in the Peruvian Andes, Antarctica and Greenland between 1980 and 1982. The drill could be driven by an electric motor, which could be powered by solar panels; testing in Greenland and Antarctica in 1981–1982 produced drilling rates of 1 cm/s on sunny days, and half that on cloudy days. Cores were typically 0.8 m to 1.2 m. A 40 m hole could be completed in less than two days; according to the designers, using the auger to drill below 40 m required "the use of a tripod and a strong desire to go deeper".

In the 1980–1981 Antarctic drilling season, the UB-II drill was lent to a British Antarctic Survey (BAS) expedition to the Antarctic Peninsula. Two cores were collected, of 30 m and 83 m, but the drill was then lost: it was dropped from the top of the 83 m hole and fell free to the bottom. It was not recovered. Another UB-II drill was used for coring at Colle Gnifetti in the summer of 1982, retrieving cores of 124 m and 66 m.

By the early 1980s the SIPRE/CRREL auger had been in widespread use for nearly thirty years without significant modifications. In 1981, CRREL took on a sea-ice study which required core with a 4.25 in diameter in unbroken lengths of at least 11 in, to allow for mechanical tests. These specifications ruled out the existing CRREL auger, and John Rand produced a new design that became known as the Rand auger. The new auger allowed for an additional section of auger flights to be added above the barrel to carry cuttings, which helped to avoid getting stuck in the hole when extracting the auger after a deep run. The larger cores required were more than three times the weight of the previous cores, which meant that it was also necessary to reduce the weight of the drilling equipment, to allow two operators to lift each core from the hole by hand. To address this, Rand used fibreglass for the core barrel, and aluminium for the cutting head and drive-head connection. The following year a revised version, known as the Big John auger, was built, with a 12 in diameter. An unusual feature of the auger was that it had no ability to break the core from the ice. In shallow holes (up to 2 m) a crowbar, inserted between the core and the hole wall, could be used to break the core; for deeper holes a cylinder fitted with spring-loaded core dogs was inserted.

=== 1990s ===
A drill with a motor and spring attached in such a way as to cause the barrel to vibrate vertically at about 50 Hz was used in the Antarctic in the 1990s at the Russian Vostok station; it proved to be very effective, boring a 6.5 m hole with a typical penetration rate of 6–8 m/min.

== Sources ==
- Aamot, Haldor W.C. (July 1967). Pendulum Steering for Thermal Probes in Glaciers (Report). Hanover, New Hampshire: Cold Regions Research and Engineering Laboratory.
- Aamot, Haldor W.C. (1968a). "Instruments and methods: instrumented probes for deep glacial investigations" (PDF). Journal of Glaciology. 7 (50): 321–328. doi:10.3189/s0022143000031087.
- Aamot, Haldor W.C. (1968b). "Instruments and methods: a buoyancy-stabilized hot-point drill for glacier studies" (PDF). Journal of Glaciology. 7 (51): 493–498. doi:10.3189/s0022143000020670.
- Agassiz, Louis (1847). Système glaciaire ou recherches sur les glaciers, leur mécanisme, leur ancienne extension, et le rôle qu'ils ont joué dans l'histoire de la terre (in French). Paris: Victor Masson.
- Agassiz, Louis (1866). Geological Sketches. Boston: Ticknor and Fields.
- Anonymous (1957). "Instruments and methods: ice drills and corers" (PDF). Journal of Glaciology. 3 (21): 30. doi:10.3189/s0022143000024680.
- Anonymous (30 June 2017). Long Range Drilling Technology Plan (Report). Madison, Wisconsin: Ice Drilling Design and Operations.
- Àrnason, Bragi; Björnsson, Helgi; Theodórsson, Páll (1974). "Mechanical drill for deep coring in temperate ice". Journal of Glaciology. 13 (67): 133–139. Bibcode:1974JGlac..13..133A. doi:10.3189/s0022143000023443.
- Barry, Roger; Gan, Thian Yew (2011). The Global Cryosphere: Past, Present and Future. Cambridge: Cambridge University Press. ISBN 978-0-521-76981-5.
- Benson, T.; Cherwinka, J.; Duvernois, M.; Elcheikh, A.; Feyzi, F.; Greenler, L.; Haugen, J.; Karle, A.; Mulligan, M.; Paulos, R. (2014). "IceCube Enhanced Hot Water Drill functional description" (PDF). Annals of Glaciology. 55 (68): 105–114. Bibcode:2014AnGla..55..105B. doi:10.3189/2014AoG68A032. Archived from the original (PDF) on 2017-12-01.
- Bentley, Charles R.; Koci, Bruce R. (2007). "Drilling to the beds of the Greenland and Antarctic ice sheets: a review" (PDF). Annals of Glaciology. 47 (1): 1–9. Bibcode:2007AnGla..47....1B. doi:10.3189/172756407786857695. Archived from the original (PDF) on 2017-10-11.
- Bentley, Charles R.; Koci, Bruce R.; Augustin, Laurent J.-M.; Bolsey, Robin J.; Green, James A.; Kyne, Jay D.; Lebar, Donald A.; Mason, William P.; Shturmakov, Alexander J.; Engelhardt, Hermann F.; Harrison, William D.; Hecht, Michael H.; Zagorodnov, Victor (2009). "Ice Drilling and Coring". In Bar-Cohen, Kris; Zacny, Kris (eds.). Drilling in Extreme Environments. Weinheim, Germany: Wiley-VCH. ISBN 978-3-527-40852-8.
- Bird, Ian G. (1976). "Thermal ice drilling: Australian developments and experience". In Splettstoesser, John F. (ed.). Ice-Core Drilling. Lincoln, Nebraska: University of Nebraska Press. pp. 1–18. ISBN 0-8032-5843-7.
- Blümcke, Adolf; Hess, Hans (1899). Untersuchungen Am Hintereisferner (in German). Munich: Deutschen und Österreichischen Alpenvereins.
- Blümcke, Adolf; Hess, Hans (1910). "Tiefbohrungen am Hintereisgletscher 1909". In Brückner, Eduard (ed.). Zeitschrift für Gletscherkunde, für Eiszeitforschung und Geschichte des Klimas (in German). Vol. IV. Grenoble, France: Gebrüder Borntraeger. pp. 66–70.
- Bourgin, André [in French] (1950). "Technique des sondages sous-glaciaires" (PDF). Revue de géographie alpine. 38 (4): 623–632. doi:10.3406/rga.1950.4118.
- Cao, Pinlu; Chen, Baoyi; Liu, Chunpeng; Talalay, Pavel; Yang, Cheng (2015). "Experimental investigation of cutting temperature in ice drilling". Cold Regions Science and Technology. 116 (116): 78–85. Bibcode:2015CRST..116...78C. doi:10.1016/j.coldregions.2015.04.008.
- Cardell, G., Hecht, M. H., Carsey, F. D., Engelhardt, H., Fisher, D., Terrell, C., & Thompson, J. (2004). "The subsurface ice probe (SIPR): a low-power thermal probe for the Martian polar layered deposits".
- Clarke, Garry K.C. (1987). "A short history of scientific investigations on glaciers". Journal of Glaciology. Special issue (S1): 4–24. Bibcode:1987JGlac..33S...4C. doi:10.3189/S0022143000215785.
- Clausen, H.B.; Gundestrup, N.S.; Hansen, S.B.; Johnsen, S.J. (1988). "Performance of the UCPH shallow – and hand augers". In Rado, C.; Beaudoing, D. (eds.). Ice Core Drilling. Grenoble, France: Laboratoire de Glaciologie et Géophysique de l'Environnement. pp. 14–20.
- Clyde, George D. (June 1932). Utah Snow Sample and Scales for Measuring Water Content of Snow (Report). Logan, Utah: Utah Agricultural Experiment Station.
- Crary, A.P. (1958). "Arctic ice island and ice shelf studies". Arctic. 11 (1): 2–42. doi:10.14430/arctic3731. JSTOR 40507179.
- Desor, Pierre (1845) [1844]. Nouvelles excursions et séjours dans les glaciers et les hautes régions des Alpes, de M. Agassiz et de ses compagnons de voyage (in French). Paris: L. Maison.
- Donnou, D.; Gillet, F.; Manouvrier, A.; Perrin, J.; Rado, C.; Ricou, G. (1984). "Deep core drilling: electro-mechanical or thermal drill?". In Holdsworth, G.; Kuivinen, K.C.; Rand, J.H. (eds.). Ice Drilling Technology. Hanover, New Hampshire: Cold Regions Research and Engineering Laboratory. pp. 81–84.
- Flusin, Georges; Bernard, C. (1909). "Forages glaciaires à grande profondeur". In Rey, Jules (ed.). Études Glaciologiques (in French). Grenoble, France: Ministère de l'agriculture. pp. 5–32.
- Forbes, James D. (1859). Occasional Papers on the Theory of Glaciers Now First Collected and Chronologically Arranged with a Prefatory Note on the Recent Progress and Present Aspect of the Theory. Edinburgh: Adam and Charles Black.
- Gerrard, J.A.F.; et al. (22 July 1952). "Measurement of the velocity distribution along a vertical line through a glacier". Proceedings of the Royal Society of London. 213 (1115): 546–558. Bibcode:1952RSPSA.213..546G. doi:10.1098/rspa.1952.0144. JSTOR 99125. S2CID 129112214.
- Gillet, F. (1975). "Instruments and methods: steam, hot-water and electrical thermal drills for temperate glaciers" (PDF). Journal of Glaciology. 14 (70): 171–179. doi:10.3189/s0022143000013484.
- Gillet, F.; Donnou, D.; Girard, C.; Manouvrier, A.; Rado, C.; Ricou, G. (1984). "Ice core quality in electro-mechanical drilling". In Holdsworth, G.; Kuivinen, K.C.; Rand, J.H. (eds.). Ice Drilling Technology. Hanover, New Hampshire: Cold Regions Research and Engineering Laboratory. pp. 73–80.
- Goetz, J.J.; Shturmakov, A.J. (2013). "Design of a new IDDO hand auger". 7th International Workshop on Ice Drilling Technology. Madison, Wisconsin: University of Wisconsin. p. 66.
- Gundestrup, N.S.; Hansen, S.B.; Johnsen, S.J. (1988). "Refinements of the UCPH shallow drill". In Rado, C.; Beaudoing, D. (eds.). Ice Core Drilling. Grenoble, France: Laboratoire de Glaciologie et Géophysique de l'Environnement. pp. 6–13.
- Gundestrup, N.S.; Johnsen, S.J.; Reeh, N. (1984). "ISTUK: a deep ice core drill system". In Holdsworth, G.; Kuivinen, K.C.; Rand, J.H. (eds.). Ice Drilling Technology. Hanover, New Hampshire: Cold Regions Research and Engineering Laboratory. pp. 7–19.
- Hamberg, Axel (1904). "Zur Technik der Gletscheruntersuchungen". Compte Rendu de la IX Session du Congrès Géologique International (Vienne 1903) (in German). Vol. 2. Vienna. pp. 749–766.
- Hansen, B. Lyle (1994). "Deep core drilling in ice" (PDF). Memoirs of National Institute of Polar Research. 49 (Special): 5–8.
- Hodge, Steven M. (1971). "Instruments and methods: a new version of a steam-operated ice drill" (PDF). Journal of Glaciology. 10 (60): 387–393. doi:10.3189/s0022143000022085.
- Hoffman, C.R.; Moser, E.H. (November 1967). Drilling tests in ice and ice-rock conglomerate (Report). Port Hueneme, California: Navy Civil Engineering Laboratory.
- Howorka, F. (1965). "Instruments and methods: a steam-operated drill for the installation of ablation stakes on glaciers" (PDF). Journal of Glaciology. 5 (41): 749–750. doi:10.3189/s002214300001875x.
- Hubbard, Bryn; Glasser, Neil (2005). Field Techniques in Glaciology and Glacial Geomorphology. Chichester, UK: Wiley. ISBN 978-0-470-84427-4.
- Iken, A.; Röthlisberger, H.; Hutter, K. (1976). "Deep drilling with a hot water jet". Zeitschrift für Gletscherkunde und Glazialgeologie. 12 (2): 143–156.
- Jouzel, J. (2013). "A brief history of ice core science over the last 50 yr". Climate of the Past. 9 (6): 2525–2547. Bibcode:2013CliPa...9.2525J. doi:10.5194/cp-9-2525-2013.
- Kamb, Barclay; Shreve, Ronald L. (1966). "Results of a new method of measuring internal deformation in glaciers". Transactions of the American Geophysical Union. 47 (1): 190.
- Knight, Peter (1999). Glaciers. Cheltenham, UK: Stanley Thornes. ISBN 0-7487-4000-7.
- Koci, Bruce R. (1984). "A lightweight hand coring auger". In Holdsworth, G.; Kuivinen, K.C.; Rand, J.H. (eds.). Ice Drilling Technology. Hanover, New Hampshire: Cold Regions Research and Engineering Laboratory. pp. 55–59.
- Koci, Bruce R. (2014). "A review of high-altitude drilling" (PDF). Memoirs of National Institute of Polar Research. 56 (Special): 1–4.
- Koci, Bruce R.; Kuivinen, Karl C. (1984). "Instruments and methods: The PICO lightweight coring auger" (PDF). Journal of Glaciology. 30 (105): 244–245. doi:10.3189/s0022143000006018.
- ch 240634, Koechlin, René, "Procédé pour sonder les glaciers et installation pour sa mise en oeuvre", published 1 May 1946
- Kyne, Jay; McConnell, Joe (2007). "The PrairieDog: a double-barrel coring drill for 'hand' augering". Annals of Glaciology. 47 (1): 99–100. Bibcode:2007AnGla..47...99K. doi:10.3189/172756407786857703.
- LaChapelle, E. (1963). "Instruments and methods: a simple thermal ice drill" (PDF). Journal of Glaciology. 4 (35): 637–642. doi:10.3189/s002214300002815x.
- Langway, C.C. (May 1967). Stratigraphic analysis of a deep ice core from Greenland (Report). Hanover, New Hampshire: Cold Regions Research and Engineering Laboratory.
- Langway, Chester C. (January 2008). "The history of early polar ice cores" (PDF). CRREL Report (TR-08-1): 1–47. Archived from the original (PDF) on 2016-11-18.
- Linell, Kenneth (1954). "Ice drilling and coring equipment". Proceedings of the Eastern Snow Conference. 2: 4–6.
- MacKinnon, P.K. (1980). "Ice Cores". Glaciological Data. Washington DC: World Data Center A for Glaciology [Snow and Ice]. ISSN 0149-1776.
- Marcou, Jules (1896). Life, Letters and Works of Louis Agassiz, Vol. I. New York: Macmillan and Co.
- Mathews, W.H. (1959). "Vertical distribution of velocity in Salmon Glacier, British Columbia" (PDF). Journal of Glaciology. 3 (26): 448–454. doi:10.3189/s0022143000017184.
- Meier, Mark F. (1960). Mode of Flow of Saskatchewan Glacier, Alberta, Canada (PDF) (Report). Washington DC: United States Department of the Interior.
- Mellor, Malcolm; Sellmann, Paul V. (1976). "General considerations for drill system design". In Splettstoesser, John F. (ed.). Ice-Core Drilling. Lincoln, Nebraska: University of Nebraska Press. pp. 77–111. ISBN 0-8032-5843-7.
- Mercanton, P.-L. (1905). "Forages glaciaires". Archives des Sciences Physiques et Naturelles (in French). 19: 367–379, 451–471.
- Miller, Maynard M. (1951). "Englacial investigations related to core drilling on the Upper Taku Glacier" (PDF). Journal of Glaciology. 5 (38): 578–581.
- National Research Council of the National Academies (2007). Exploration of Antarctic Subglacial Aquatic Environments: Environmental and Scientific Stewardship. Washington DC: National Academies Press. ISBN 978-0-309-10635-1.
- Nizery, A. (February 1951). "Electrothermic rig for the boring of glaciers". Transactions, American Geophysical Union. 32 (1): 66–72. Bibcode:1951TrAGU..32...66N. doi:10.1029/tr032i001p00066.
- Paterson, W.S.B. (1981). The Physics of Glaciers (2nd ed.). Oxford: Pergamon Press. ISBN 0-08-024004-6.
- Philberth, K. (1964). "Über zwei Elektro-Schmelzsonden mit Vertikal-Stabilisierung" (PDF). Polarforschung (in German). 34: 278–280.
- Philberth, K. (October 1972). Stabilizing the Course of a Thermal Probe (Report). Hanover, New Hampshire: Cold Regions Research and Engineering Laboratory. Original publication as Philberth, K. (February 1966). "Sur la stabilisation de la course d'une sonde thermique". Comptes rendus de l'Académie des sciences (in French). 262 (6): 456–459. Translated by U.S. Joint Publications Research Service.
- Ract-Madoux, M.; Reynaud, L. (1951). "L'exploration des glaciers en profondeur" (PDF). La Houille Blanche (in French). 37 (Special): 299–308. Bibcode:1951LHBl...37S.299R. doi:10.1051/lhb/1951009.
- Rado, Claude; Girard, Claude; Perrin, Jacky (1987). "Instruments and methods: a self-flushing hot-water drilling apparatus for glaciers with debris" (PDF). Journal of Glaciology. 33 (114): 236–238. doi:10.3189/s0022143000008741.
- Ragle, R.H.; Hansen, B. Lyle; Gow, Anthony (June 1960). Deep core drilling in the Ross Ice Shelf, Little America V, Antarctica (Report). Wilmette, Illinois: US Army Snow, Ice and Permafrost Research Establishment.
- Rand, John (July–August 1975). "100-meter ice cores from the South Pole and the Ross Ice Shelf" (PDF). Antarctic Journal. 10 (4): 150–151.
- Rand, John H. (1976). "The USA CRREL shallow drill". In Splettstoesser, John F. (ed.). Ice-Core Drilling. Lincoln, Nebraska: University of Nebraska Press. pp. 133–138. ISBN 0-8032-5843-7.
- Rand, John (October 1977). "Ross Ice Shelf Project drilling, October–December 1976". Antarctic Journal. 12 (4): 150–152.
- Reeh, N. (1984). "Antitorque leaf springs: a design guide for ice-drill antitorque leaf springs". In Holdsworth, G.; Kuivinen, K.C.; Rand, J.H. (eds.). Ice Drilling Technology. Hanover, New Hampshire: Cold Regions Research and Engineering Laboratory. pp. 69–72.
- Remenieras, G.; Terrier, M. (1951). "La sonde électrothermique E.D.F. pour le forage des glaciers". Assemblée Générales de Bruxelles: Tome I (PDF) (in French). L'Association Internationale D'Hydrologie Scientifique. pp. 254–260. Archived from the original (PDF) on 2017-10-21.
- Renaud, A.; Mercanton, P.L. (1948) Les Sondages Sismiques de la Commission Helvétique des Glaciers. Publications du Bureau Central Seismologique International, Travaux Scientifique, Serie A. Fascicule 17, Communications presentées à la conférence de Union Geodesique et Geophysique International d'Oslo, August 1948.
- Reynaud, L.; Courdouan, P. (1962). "Reconnaissance du thalweg sous-glaciaire de la Mer de Glace en vue de l'etablissement d'une prise d'eau" (PDF). La Houille Blanche. 48 (Special): 808–816. Bibcode:1962LHBl...48S.808R. doi:10.1051/lhb/1962014.
- Schimpp, Otto (1960). "Der Haushalt des Hintereisferners (Ötztal): Akkumulation, Ablation und Gletscherbewegung in den Jahren 1952/53 1953/54". Veröffentlichungen des Museums Ferdinandeum in Innsbruck (PDF) (in German). Innsbruck. pp. 66–138.
- Seligman, Gerald (May 1941). "The structure of a temperate glacier". The Geographical Journal. 97 (5): 295–315. Bibcode:1941GeogJ..97..295S. doi:10.2307/1787399. JSTOR 1787399.
- Sharp, Robert P. (1951). "Thermal regimen of firn on Upper Seward Glacier, Yukon Territory, Canada". Journal of Glaciology. 1 (9): 476–487. doi:10.3189/s0022143000026460.
- Sharp, Robert P. (1953). "Deformation of a vertical bore hole in a Piedmont glacier" (PDF). Journal of Glaciology. 2 (13): 182–184. doi:10.3189/s0022143000025685.
- Sheldon, Simon G.; et al. (2014). "Promising new borehole liquids for ice-core drilling on the East Antarctic high plateau" (PDF). Annals of Glaciology. 55 (68): 260–270. Bibcode:2014AnGla..55..260S. doi:10.3189/2014AoG68A043. Archived from the original (PDF) on 2017-09-04.
- Shoemaker, Brian (23 October 2002). "Interview of Herb Ueda". Ohio State University. hdl:1811/44677.
- Shreve, R.L.; Kamb, W.B. (1964). "Instruments and methods: portable thermal core drill for temperate glaciers" (PDF). Journal of Glaciology. 5 (37): 113–117. doi:10.3189/s002214300002863x.
- Shreve, R.L.; Sharp, R.P. (1970). "Internal deformation and thermal anomalies in lower Blue Glacier, Mount Olympus, Washington" (PDF). Journal of Glaciology. 9 (55): 65–86. doi:10.3189/s0022143000026800.
- Siegert, Martin J.; Makinson, Keith; Blake, David; Mowlem, Matt; Ross, Neil (2014). "An assessment of deep hot-water drilling as a means to undertake direct measurement and sampling of Antarctic subglacial lakes: experience and lessons learned from the Lake Ellsworth field season 2012/13" (PDF). Annals of Glaciology. 55 (65): 59–73. Bibcode:2014AnGla..55...59S. doi:10.3189/2014AoG65A008. Archived from the original (PDF) on 2017-12-01.
- Soils, Foundation and Frost Effects Laboratory (March 1950). Final report on development of ice mechanics test kit for hydrographic office (Report). Boston, Massachusetts: US Navy. Archived from the original on 2017-10-29.
- Stacey, J.S. (1960). "Instruments and methods: a prototype hotpoint for thermal boring on the Athabaska Glacier" (PDF). Journal of Glaciology. 3 (28): 783–786. doi:10.3189/s0022143000018098.
- Süsstrunk, A. (1951). "Sondage du Glacier par la méthode sismique" (PDF). La Houille Blanche. 37 (Special): 309–318. Bibcode:1951LHBl...37S.309S. doi:10.1051/lhb/1951010.
- Suzuki, Yosio (1976). "Deep core drilling by Japanese Antarctic Research Expeditions". In Splettstoesser, John F. (ed.). Ice-Core Drilling. Lincoln, Nebraska: University of Nebraska Press. pp. 155–166. ISBN 0-8032-5843-7.
- Suzuki, Yosio; Takizawa, T. (1978). "Outline of the drilling operation at Mizuho Station" (PDF). Memoirs of National Institute of Polar Research. 10 (Special): 1–24.
- Talalay, Pavel G. (April 2012). Drill heads of the deep ice electromechanical drills (Report). Jilin University, China: Polar Research Center.
- Talalay, Pavel G. (2014). "Perspectives for development of ice-core drilling technology: a discussion" (PDF). Annals of Glaciology. 55 (68): 339–350. Bibcode:2014AnGla..55..339T. doi:10.3189/2014aog68a007. Archived from the original (PDF) on 2017-12-01.
- Talalay, Pavel G. (2016). Mechanical Ice Drilling Technology. Beijing: Springer. ISBN 978-7-116-09172-6.
- Talalay, Pavel G.; Fan, Xiaopeng; Zheng, Zhichuan; Xue, Jun; Cao, Pinlu; Zhang, Nan; Wang, Rusheng; Yu, Dahui; Yu, Chengfeng; Zhang, Yunlong; Zhang, Qi; Su, Kai; Zhan, Dongdong; Zhan, Jiewei (2014). "Anti-torque systems of electromechanical cable-suspended drills and test results". Annals of Glaciology. 55 (68): 207–218. Bibcode:2014AnGla..55..207T. doi:10.3189/2014aog68a025.
- Theodórsson, Páll (1976). "Thermal and mechanical drilling in temperate ice in Icelandic glaciers". In Splettstoesser, John F. (ed.). Ice-Core Drilling. Lincoln, Nebraska: University of Nebraska Press. pp. 179–189. ISBN 0-8032-5843-7.
- Uchida, Tsutomu; Duval, P.; Lipenkov, V.Ya.; Hondoh, T.; Mae, S.; Shoji, H. (1994). "Brittle zone and air-hydrate formation in polar ice sheets" (PDF). Memoirs of National Institute of Polar Research (49)..
- Ueda, Herbert T.; Garfield, Donald E. (1969). "Instruments and methods: the USA CRREL drill for thermal coring in ice" (PDF). Journal of Glaciology. 8 (53): 311–314. doi:10.3189/s0022143000031282.
- Ueda, Herbert T.; Talalay, Pavel G. (October 2007). "Fifty Years of Soviet and Russian Drilling Activity in Polar and Non-Polar Ice". Erdc/Crrel Tr-07-20. Archived from the original on April 20, 2017.
- Vallot, J. (1898). "Exploration des moulins de la mer de glace: Forage de M. Émile Vallot". In Steinheil, G. (ed.). Annales de l'Observatoire météorologique physique et glaciaire du Mont-Blanc (in French). Vol. 3. Paris. pp. 190–193.
- von Drygalski, Erich (1904). Deutsche Südpolar-Expedition (in German). Berlin: Georg Reimer.
- von Drygalski, Erich (1897). Grönland-Expedition der Gesellschaft für Erdkunde zu Berlin 1891-1893: Erster Band (in German). Berlin: W.H. Kühl.
- Ward, W.H. (1952). "The glaciological studies of the Baffin Island Expedition, 1950: Part III: Equipment and techniques". Journal of Glaciology. 2 (12): 115–121. doi:10.3189/s0022143000034079.
- Ward, W.H. (1961). "Experiences with electro-thermal ice drills on Austerdalsbre 1956–59". Assemblée Générales de Helsinki: Commission des Neiges et Glaces (PDF). Gentbrugge, Belgium: L'Association Internationale D'Hydrologie Scientifique. pp. 532–542. Archived from the original (PDF) on 2017-10-21.
- Wehrle, E. (1985). "A shallow core-collecting mechanical ice drill". In Jacka, T.H. (ed.). ANARE Research Notes 28. Kingston, Tasmania: Australian National Antarctic Research Expeditions. pp. 196–201.
- Wright, Edmund A. (1986). CRREL's First 25 Years: 1961–1986. Hanover, New Hampshire: CRREL.
- Zagorodnov, V.S.; Kelley, J.J.; Koci, B.; Stanford, K.L.; Collins, J. (May 1992). Directional drilling (Report). Fairbanks, Alaska: Polar Ice Coring Office.
- Zagorodnov, V.; Thompson, L.G. (2014). "Thermal electric ice-core drills: history and new design options for intermediate-depth drilling". Annals of Glaciology. 55 (68): 322–330. Bibcode:2014AnGla..55..322Z. doi:10.3189/2014AoG68A012.
