= Hakebreen =

Glacier in Svalbard, Norway

Coordinates: 79.17°N 12.39°E

Hakebreen ("The Hook Glacier") is a glacier in Haakon VII Land at Spitsbergen, Svalbard. It has a length of about five kilometers, and is a tributary glacier to the Fjortende Julibreen. The glacier is surrounded by the mountains of Målarryggen, Foreltinden, Forelryggen, Giardtinden, Fregatten and Haken.
