= Forelryggen =

Mountain ridge in Spitsbergen, Norway

Coordinates: 79.172°N 12.453°E

Forelryggen is a mountain ridge in Haakon VII Land at Spitsbergen, Svalbard. The ridge reaches a height of 1,095 m.a.s.l., and is located between the glaciers of Fjortende Julibreen and Hakebreen. The mountain peak of Foreltinden is located between the ridges of Forelryggen and Målarryggen.

The ridge is named after Swiss glaciologist François-Alphonse Forel.
