= Mercanton =

Mercanton is a surname. Notable people with the surname include:

- Jacques Mercanton, French cinematographer
- Jean Mercanton (1920–1947), French actor
- Louis Mercanton (1879-1932), Swiss film director, screenwriter and actor
- Paul Louis Mercanton, Swiss meteorologist and glaciologist
- Victoria Mercanton, French film director and editor

== See also ==
- Mercanton Heights, in the Arrowsmith Peninsula, Graham Land, Antarctica
