= Løvlandfjellet =

Mountain in Svalbard, Norway

Coordinates: 79.0859°N 12.1115°E

Løvlandfjellet is a mountain in Haakon VII Land at Spitsbergen, Svalbard. It reaches a height of 943 m.a.s.l., and is located north of Kongsfjorden, between the glaciers of Junibreen, Løvlandbreen, Svansbreen, Maibreen and Fjortende Julibreen. The mountain is named after Norwegian politician Jørgen Løvland.
