= Fjortende Julibreen =

Glacier in Svalbard

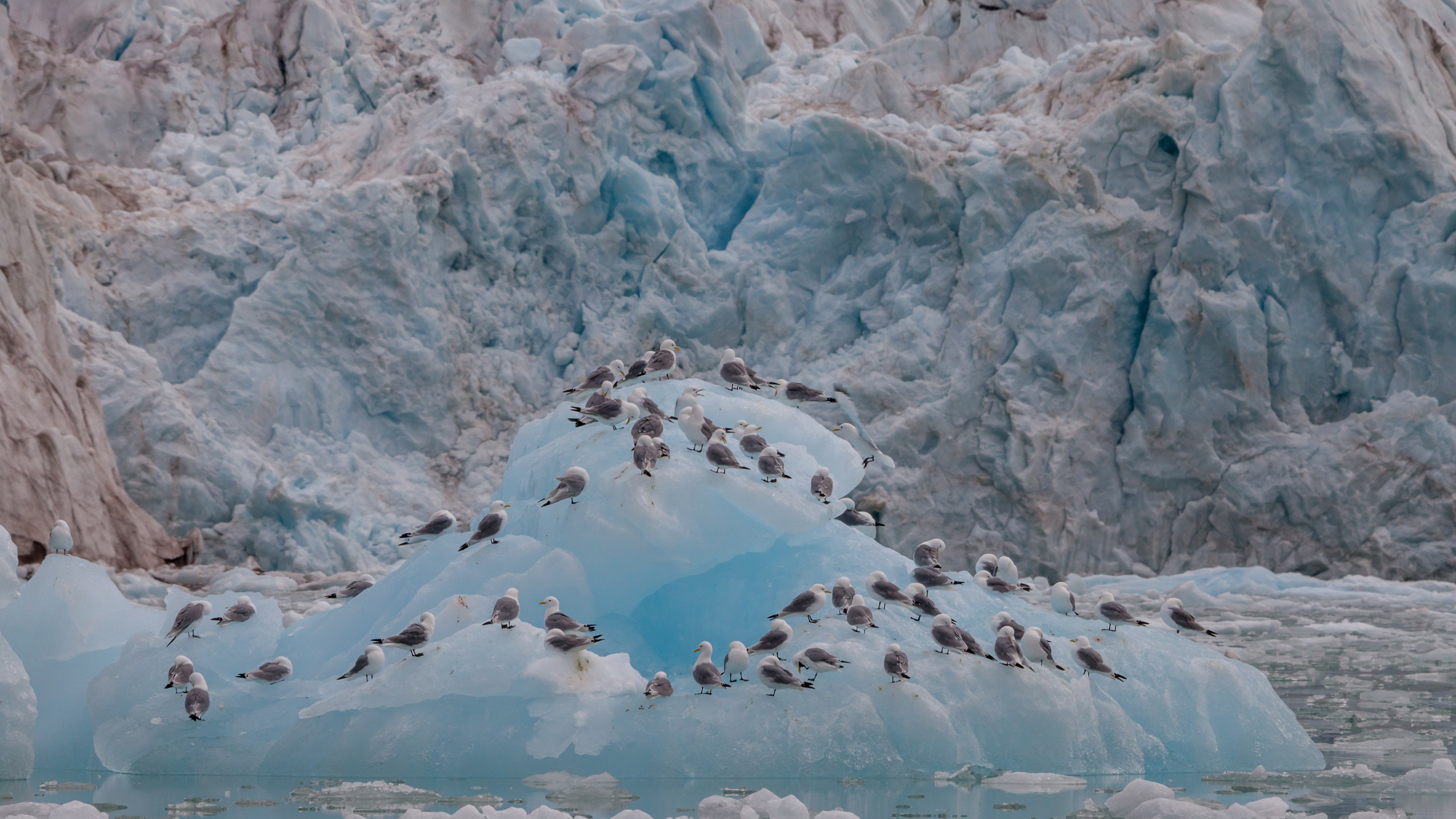
- Kittywakes at Fjortende Julibreen, Krossfjord, Svalbard

- Location within Svalbard
- Type: Glacier
- Location: Haakon VII Land; Spitsbergen, Svalbard
- Coordinates: 79.1233°N 12.1561°E
- Area: 127 km^{2} (49 sq mi)
- Length: 16 km (9.9 mi)

Fjortende Julibreen is a glacier in Haakon VII Land at Spitsbergen, Svalbard. It has a length of about sixteen kilometers, and a total area of about 127 km^{2}. It is located between Reppingen, Løvlandfjellet and Mercantonfjellet to the south, and Casimir-Périerkammen, Forelryggen and Foreltinden to the north, and extends down to Fjortende Julibukta in Krossfjorden. The glacier is named after the National Day of France, the 14 July.
