= Mercantonfjellet =

Coordinates: 79.0990°N 12.2826°E

Mercantonfjellet is a mountain area in Haakon VII Land at Spitsbergen, Svalbard. It has a length of about seven kilometres, and is located between Fjortende Julibreen and Blomstrandbreen. Among the peaks are Svansen and Sveitsartoppen. The area is named after Swiss glaciologist Paul Louis Mercanton.
