= Herbert T. Ueda =

American ice drilling engineer (1929–2020)

- Born: April 17, 1929; Puyallup, Washington
- Died: June 13, 2020 (aged 91)
- Education: University of Illinois at Urbana–Champaign

Herbert T. Ueda (April 17, 1929 - June 13, 2020) was an American ice drilling engineer.

Ueda was born and raised in the Puyallup Valley in Washington. His parents were farm laborers, and were of Japanese descent. The Ueda family was interned in Idaho's Minidoka War Relocation Center for three years, beginning in the summer of 1942, after the Japanese attack on Pearl Harbor and signing of Executive Order 9066. He was drafted into the Army in 1951 for two years, and attended the University of Illinois, first at Navy Pier and then at Champaign-Urbana, graduating as a mechanical engineer in 1958. Later that year he was hired by Lyle Hansen to work at the Snow, Ice, and Permafrost Research Establishment (SIPRE).

Ueda worked on the development of a thermal drill for SIPRE, initially under Fred Pollack; when Pollack left Ueda took over the project. It was tested in Greenland, at Camp Tuto and Camp Century. in the later 1950s and early 1960s, reaching over 500 feet in 1961, over 700 feet depth in 1962, and almost 900 feet in 1963. At that point they began working on adapting a cable-suspended electromechanical drill, designed by Armais Arutunoff for mineral drilling, to be used in ice. A secondhand drill was acquired in 1963, and in 1964, when the thermal drill reached 1800 feet, they switched to using the electromechanical drill, and it worked well. After two more seasons of drilling it finally reached bedrock at about 4,550 ft. Ueda later described it as "the most satisfying moment of my life, or of my career".

In 1966 and 1967 he was at Byrd Station in the Antarctic, where the drill was used to reach 7102 feet at bedrock. After this he worked on building drills for other organizations, including Ohio State and the Australian National Antarctic Research Expeditions (ANARE). He worked on the Ross Ice Shelf Project with John Rand in the 1970s, and then worked on the DYE sites in Greenland. He retired from SIPRE (by this time renamed to Cold Regions Research and Engineering Laboratory) in 1987, and worked for the Polar Ice Coring Office (PICO) for a while as technical director of operations, working for John Kelle. In 1989 he visited Greenland to work on the GISP 2 program.

Ueda died of natural causes in 2020.

== Sources ==
Shoemaker, Brian (23 October 2002). Herb Ueda (PDF) (Report). hdl:1811/44677.
