= Xavier Ract-Madoux =

Xavier Ract-Madoux was a French hydraulician. He joined Electricité de France (EDF) in 1947 and remained with them for the rest of his working life. He became Controller General of EDF in 1973, and later became a vice-director. He was a member of the Société Hydrotechnique de France and the General Secretary of the French Committee of Large Dams.

In the summer of 1949, Xavier Ract-Madoux and L. Reynaud, tested an electrothermal ice drill in the Alps. They were surveying the Mer de Glace for EDF to determine if it could be used as a source of hydroelectric power. Experiments in 1944 had demonstrated that using explosives to clear tunnels through the ice was ineffective; some passages to the interior of the glacier were opened by digging, but these closed within days due to the pressure and plasticity of the ice, which overwhelmed any attempt to brace the tunnels open with wood. Ract-Madoux and Reynaud's drill consisted of a 1 m-long (3.3 ft) resistor wound in a cone shape, with a maximum diameter of 50 mm. This was suspended from a cable via a tripod over the borehole, and was able to drill 24 m (79 ft) in an hour under ideal conditions.

== Sources ==
- Hager, Willi (2014). Hydraulicians in Europe 1800-2000, Volume 2. Boca Raton, Florida: CRC Press. ISBN 978-1-4665-5498-6.
- Nizery, A. (February 1951). "Electrothermic rig for the boring of glaciers". Transactions, American Geophysical Union. 32 (1): 66–72. Bibcode:1951TrAGU..32...66N. doi:10.1029/tr032i001p00066.
- Ract-Madoux, M.; Reynaud, L. (1951). "L'exploration des glaciers en profondeur" (PDF). La Houille Blanche (in French). 37 (Special): 299–308. doi:10.1051/lhb/1951009.
