= Foreltinden =

Mountain in Spitsbergen, Norway

Coordinates: 79.1809°N 12.5055°E

Foreltinden is a mountain in Haakon VII Land at Spitsbergen, Svalbard. It reaches a height of 1,275 m.a.s.l., and is located east of Tinayrebukta in Krossfjorden, between Målarryggen and Forelryggen. The mountain is named after Swiss glaciologist and limnologist François-Alphonse Forel.
