= Paul Louis Mercanton =

Swiss meteorologist and glaciologist

Paul-Louis Mercanton
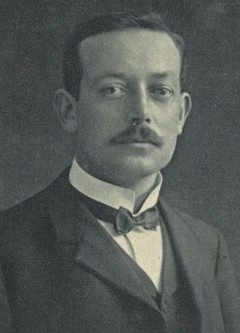
- Mercanton in 1919
- Born: 11 May 1876; Lausanne, Switzerland
- Died: 25 February 1963 (aged 86); Lausanne, Switzerland
- Education: University of Lausanne
- Occupations: Glaciologist, meteorologist
- Employer: Central Meteorological Institute

Paul-Louis Mercanton (11 May 1876 – 25 February 1963) was a Swiss glaciologist, meteorologist and Arctic explorer.

== Biography ==
Mercanton was born in Lausanne on 11 May 1876, the son of Eugène Mercanton, a lawyer, and Félicie Marie Lavanchy. He graduated in electrical engineering from the University of Lausanne in 1899, and obtained a doctorate in physics from the same university in 1901. Mercanton was a professor of physics and electricity, then of meteorology and geophysics, at Lausanne from 1904 to 1938. He married Alice Marguerite Colomb in 1907.

Mercanton directed Vaud's meteorological service from 1911 to 1941 and the Swiss Central Meteorological Station in Zurich from 1934 to 1941, and was editor and co-author of Variations périodiques des glaciers des Alpes suisses ("Periodic Variations of the Glaciers of the Swiss Alps") between 1907 and 1954. He also regularly wrote reports on other glaciers of Europe. Mercanton was a pioneer by publishing in 1916 a work on modern observation of glaciers entitled Vermessungen am Rhonegletscher 1874-1915. From 1909 until his death, Mercanton was a member of the Glacier Commission of the Swiss Society of Natural Sciences, a commission he chaired for thirty-two years. He died in Lausanne on 25 February 1963.

=== Arctic expeditions ===
Mercanton was a member of expeditions to Spitsbergen (1910), Greenland (1912–1913) and Jan Mayen (1921 and 1929). In 1921 he was part of a team which successfully climbed the Beerenberg volcano on Jan Mayen island for the first time. Mercantonfjellet, a mountainous area on Svalbard, is named after him.

== See also ==
- Xavier Guillaume Mertz, contemporary Swiss polar explorer

== Bibliography ==
- Lauritzen, P. R., ed. (2009). "Mercantonfjellet". Norsk Fjelleksikon (in Norwegian). Arendal: Friluftsforlaget. ISBN 9788291495477.
