= Armais Arutunoff =

Inventor of technology for oil drilling

Armais Sergeevich Arutunoff (June 21, 1893 – February 1978) was an inventor of technology for oil drilling. He was born in Tiflis, then part of the Russian Empire, into an Armenian family. He emigrated to the United States in 1923, and moved to Oklahoma in 1928, where he started a company to build an electric submersible pump for use at the bottom of oil boreholes. By 1938 it is estimated that two percent of all oil produced in the US was lifted by an Arutunoff pump. He was inducted into the Oklahoma Hall of Fame in 1974. The company he started, soon renamed Reda Pump, an acronym of Russian Electrical Dynamo of Arutunoff, was acquired by Schlumberger. He died in February 1978 in Bartlesville.
