= Målarryggen =

Mountain ridge in Svalbard, Norway

Coordinates: 79.192°N 12.443°E

Målarryggen ("The Painter Ridge") is a mountain ridge in Haakon VII Land at Spitsbergen, Svalbard. It has a length of about three kilometers, and is located between the glaciers of Hakebreen and Tinayrebreen. The ridge is named in honor of the French painter Jean Paul Louis Tinayre.
