= Solryggen =

Coordinates: 77.981°N 13.771°E

Solryggen ("The Sun Ridge") is a mountain ridge in Nordenskiöld Land at Spitsbergen, Svalbard. It has a length of about five kilometers and contains peaks of heights 759 and 636 m.a.s.l. The mountain is located south in the ridge of Linnéfjella. The glacier of Solfonna is located between Solryggen and Aagaardtoppen.
