= Linnébreen =

Norwegian glacier

Coordinates: 77.96°N 13.91°E

Linnébreen is a glacier in Nordenskiöld Land at Spitsbergen, Svalbard, Norway. It is named after Swedish botanist Carl Linnaeus. The glacier has a length of about 3.5 kilometers, and flows from the mountain of Systemafjellet towards the valley of Linnédalen. It is proximate to the mountain of Christensenfjella.
