= Systemafjellet =

Mountain of Spitsbergen, Norway

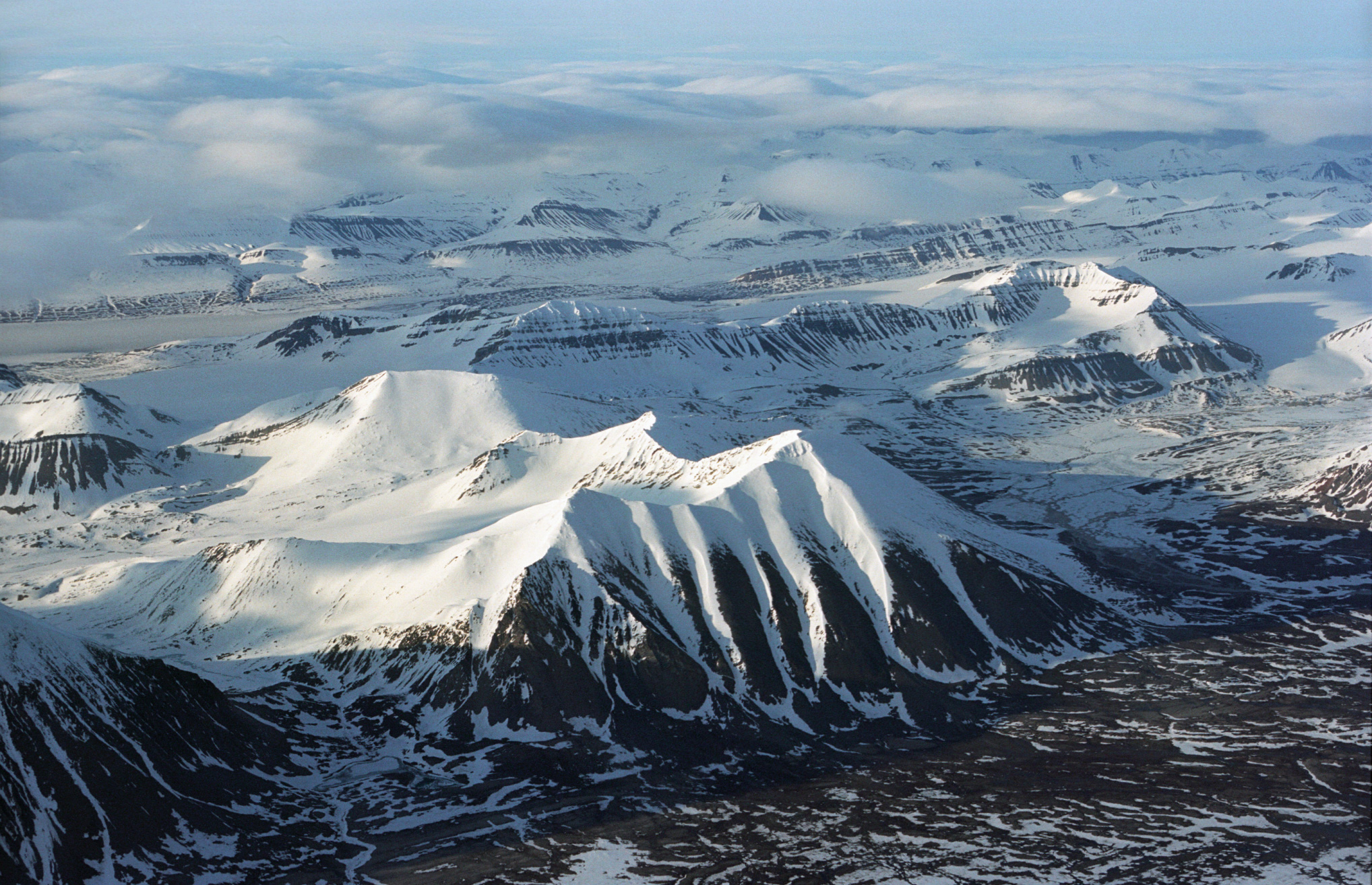
- Systemafjellet, with Orustdalen valley in the background

Highest point
- Elevation: 775 m (2,543 ft)
- Coordinates: 77°56′55″N 13°52′29″E

Dimensions
- Length: 3 km (1.9 mi)

Geography
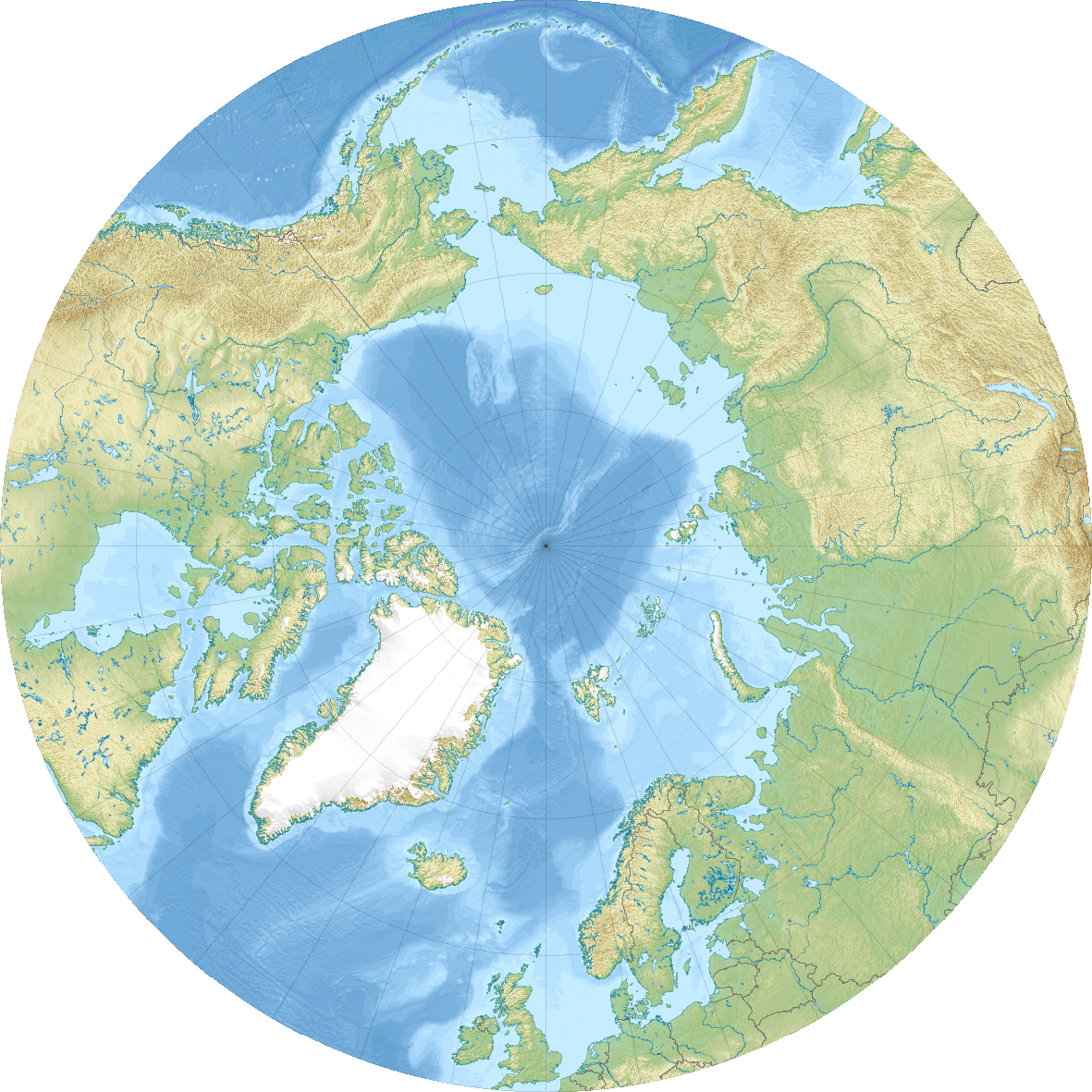
- Location within Svalbard Location within Arctic
- Location: Nordenskiöld Land at Spitsbergen, Svalbard, Norway

Systemafjellet is a mountain in Nordenskiöld Land at Spitsbergen, Svalbard. It is named after the work Systema Naturae by Carl Linnaeus. The mountain has a length of about three kilometers, and peaks of 745 and 667 m.a.s.l. It is located between the valley of Orustdalen and the mountain ridge of Linnéfjella. The glacier of Linnébreen flows from Systemafjellet down towards Linnédalen.
