= Christensenfjella =

Mountain in Spitsbergen, Norway

Coordinates: 77.963°N 13.973°E

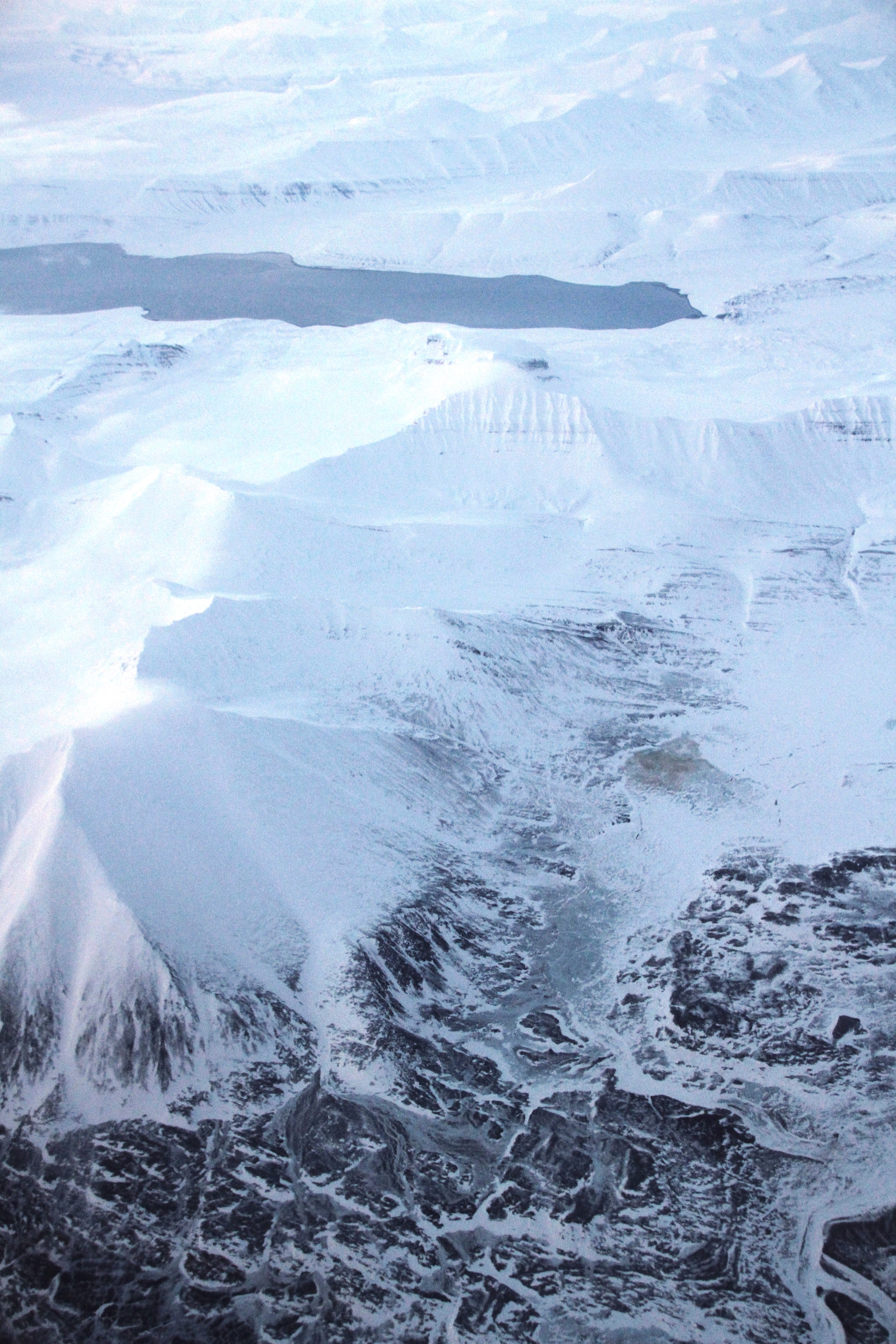
Image from the west towards east, of western Nordenskiöld Land, Close to Grönfjorden - western Spitsbergen, Norway.

Christensenfjella is a mountain in Nordenskiöld Land at Spitsbergen, Svalbard. It is named after Norwegian shipowner Christen Christensen. The mountain has several peaks, the highest is 682 m.a.s.l. It is located east of Systemafjellet and north of Orustdalen, and is proximate to the glaciers of Aldegondabreen and Linnébreen.
