= Linnéfjella =

Mountain ridge in Spitsbergen, Svalbard

Coordinates: 78.01°N 13.78°E

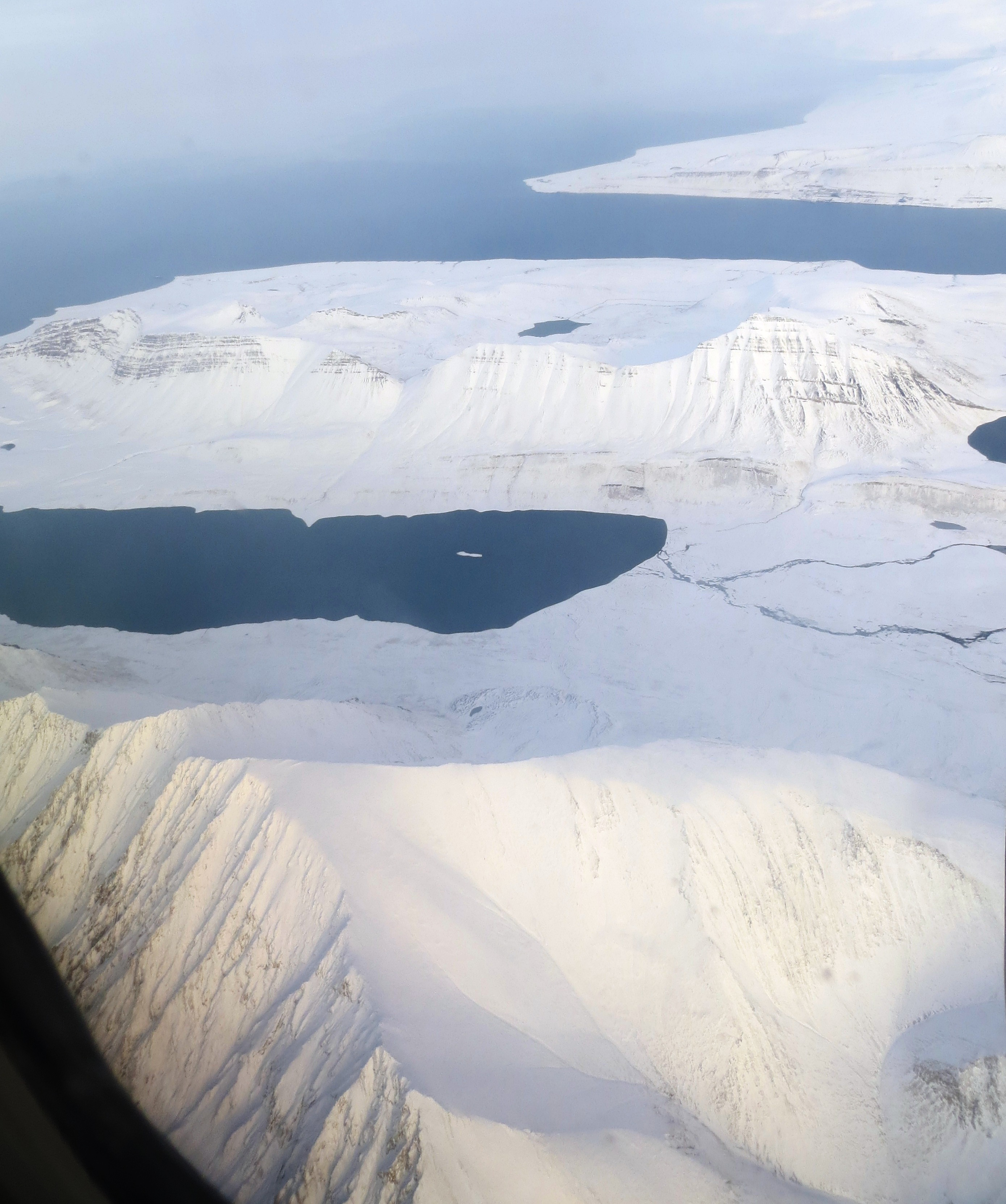
Griegfjellet is in the foreground with Linnévatnet in the centre.

Linnéfjella is a mountain ridge in Nordenskiöld Land at Spitsbergen, Svalbard. It is named after Swedish botanist Carl Linnaeus. The ridge contains the mountains of Solryggen, Aagaardtoppen, Griegfjellet and Griegaksla. East of the ridge is the valley of Linnédalen.
