= Orustdalen =

Valley of Spitsbergen, Norway

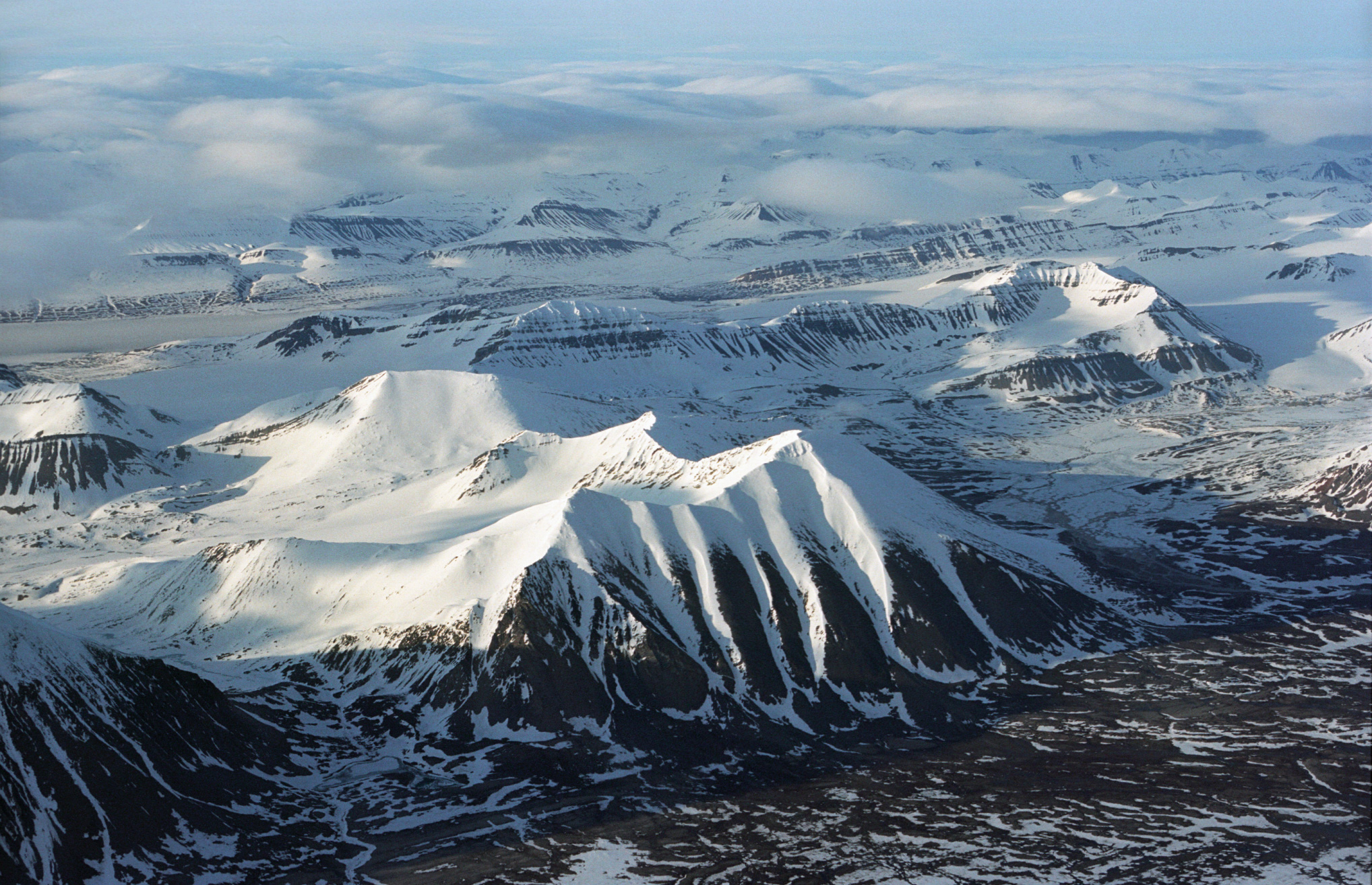
- Orustdalen valley in the background of the Systemafjellet mountain

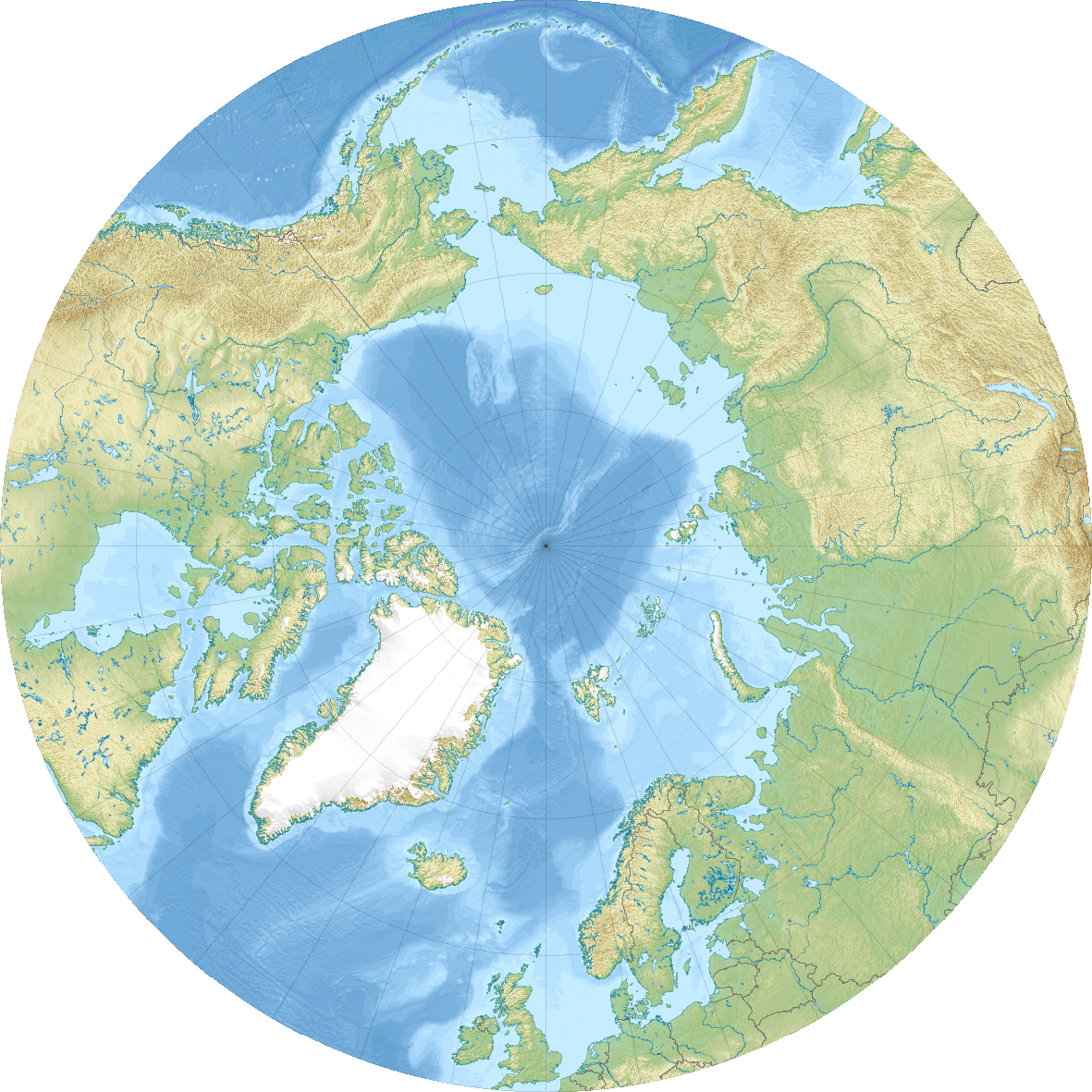
- Location within Svalbard Location within Arctic
- Length: 5 km (3.1 mi)
- Width: 2 km (1.2 mi)

Geography
- Location: Nordenskiöld Land, Spitsbergen, Svalbard
- Coordinates: 77°56′10″N 13°57′36″E
- Interactive map of Orustdalen

Orustdalen is a valley in Nordenskiöld Land at Spitsbergen, Svalbard. It is named after Swedish island of Orust in the province of Bohuslän. The valley has a length of about five kilometers and a width of two kilometers. It is located south of the mountains of Qvigstadfjellet, Christensenfjella and Systemafjellet.
