= Aagaardfjellet =

Mountain in Sabine Land, Spitsbergen, Svalbard

- Location within Svalbard

Highest point
- Elevation: 684 m (2,244 ft)
- Coordinates: 78.411°N 18.554°E

Geography
- Location: Sabine Land, Svalbard, Norway

Aagaardfjellet is a mountain in Sabine Land at Spitsbergen, Svalbard. It is named after Norwegian businessperson Andreas Zacharias Aagaard (1847-1925). The mountain has a height of 684 m.a.s.l., and is situated north of the glacier of Hayesbreen, and west of the bay of Wichebukta.

== See also ==
- Aagaardtoppen
