= Qvigstadfjellet =

Mountain in Svalbard, Norway

Coordinates: 77.956°N 14.054°E

Qvigstadfjellet is a mountain in Nordenskiöld Land at Spitsbergen, Svalbard. It is named after Norwegian philologist and politician Just Knud Qvigstad. The mountain reaches a height of 770 m.a.s.l. It is located between the valley of Orustdalen and the glacier of Vestre Grønfjordbreen, south of Aldegondabreen.
