= Aldegondabreen =

Norwegian glacier

Coordinates: 77.973°N 14.080°E

Aldegondabreen is a glacier in Nordenskiöld Land at Spitsbergen, Svalbard, Norway. It is named after Infanta Adelgundes, Duchess of Guimarães. The glacier has a length of about 5.5 kilometers. It flows from Qvigstadfjellet, Christensenfjella and Hermod Petersenfjellet towards Grønfjorden.
