= Griegfjellet =

Mountain in Spitsbergen, Norway

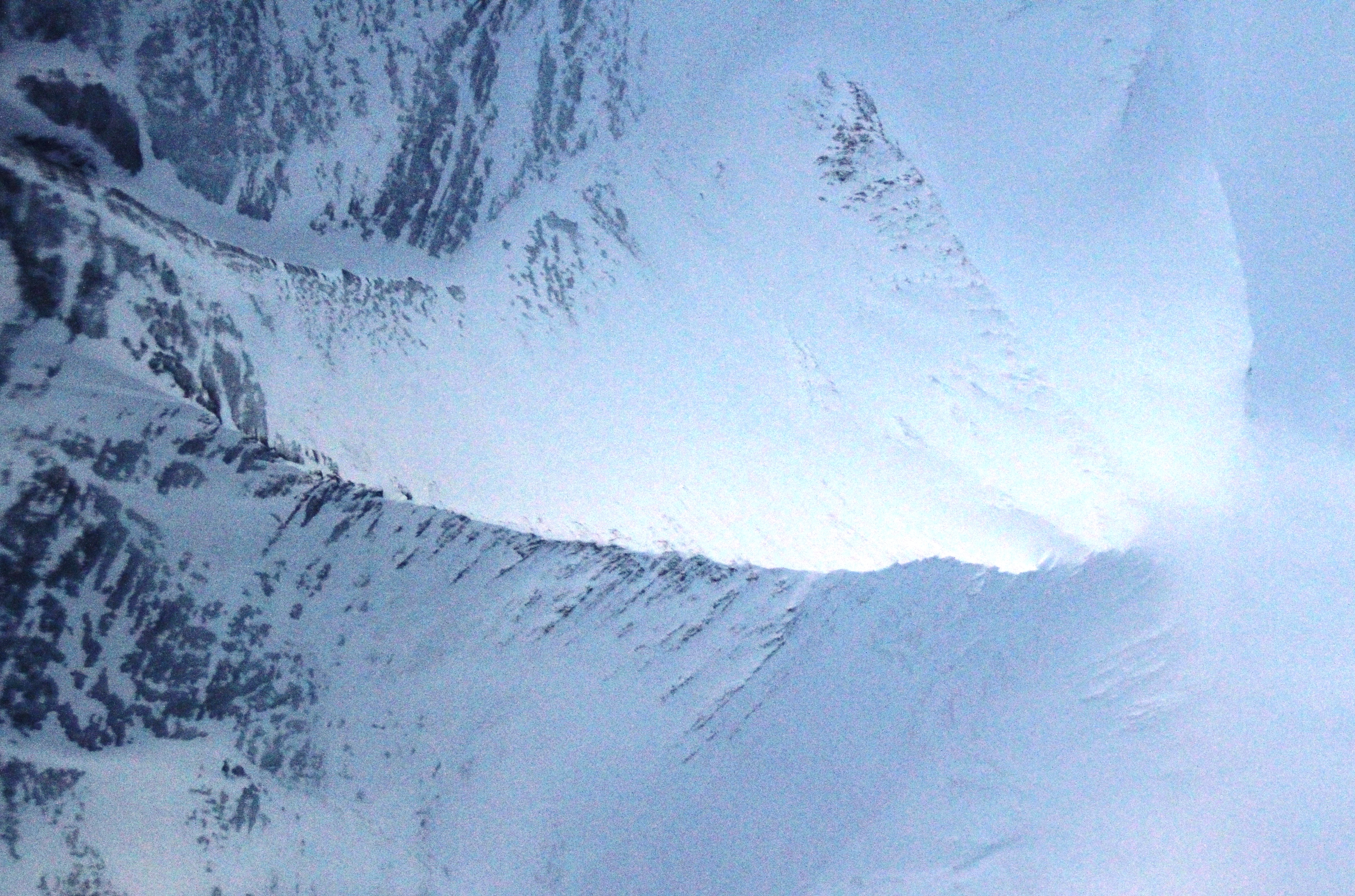

Highest point
- Elevation: 781 m (2,562 ft)
- Coordinates: 78.023°N 13.754°E

Geography
- Location within Svalbard
- Location: Nordenskiöld Land, Spitsbergen, Norway

Griegfjellet is a mountain in Nordenskiöld Land at Spitsbergen, Svalbard. It has a length of about 4.5 kilometers and contains several peaks, of which the highest is 781 m.a.s.l. The mountain is part of Linnéfjella. It is named after Norwegian ship broker and politician Joachim Grieg.
