= Aagaardtoppen =

Mountain in Nordenskiöld Land, Spitsbergen, Svalbard

- Location within Svalbard

Highest point
- Elevation: 731 m (2,398 ft)
- Coordinates: 77.996°N 13.815°E

Geography
- Location: Nordenskiöld Land, Svalbard, Norway

Aagaardtoppen is a mountain in Nordenskiöld Land at Spitsbergen, Svalbard. It reaches a height of 731 m.a.s.l. and is part of the mountain ridge of Linnéfjella. The mountain is named after Norwegian businessperson Andreas Zacharias Aagaard.

== See also ==
- Aagaardfjellet
