= Linnévatnet =

Lake at Spitsbergen, Svalbard

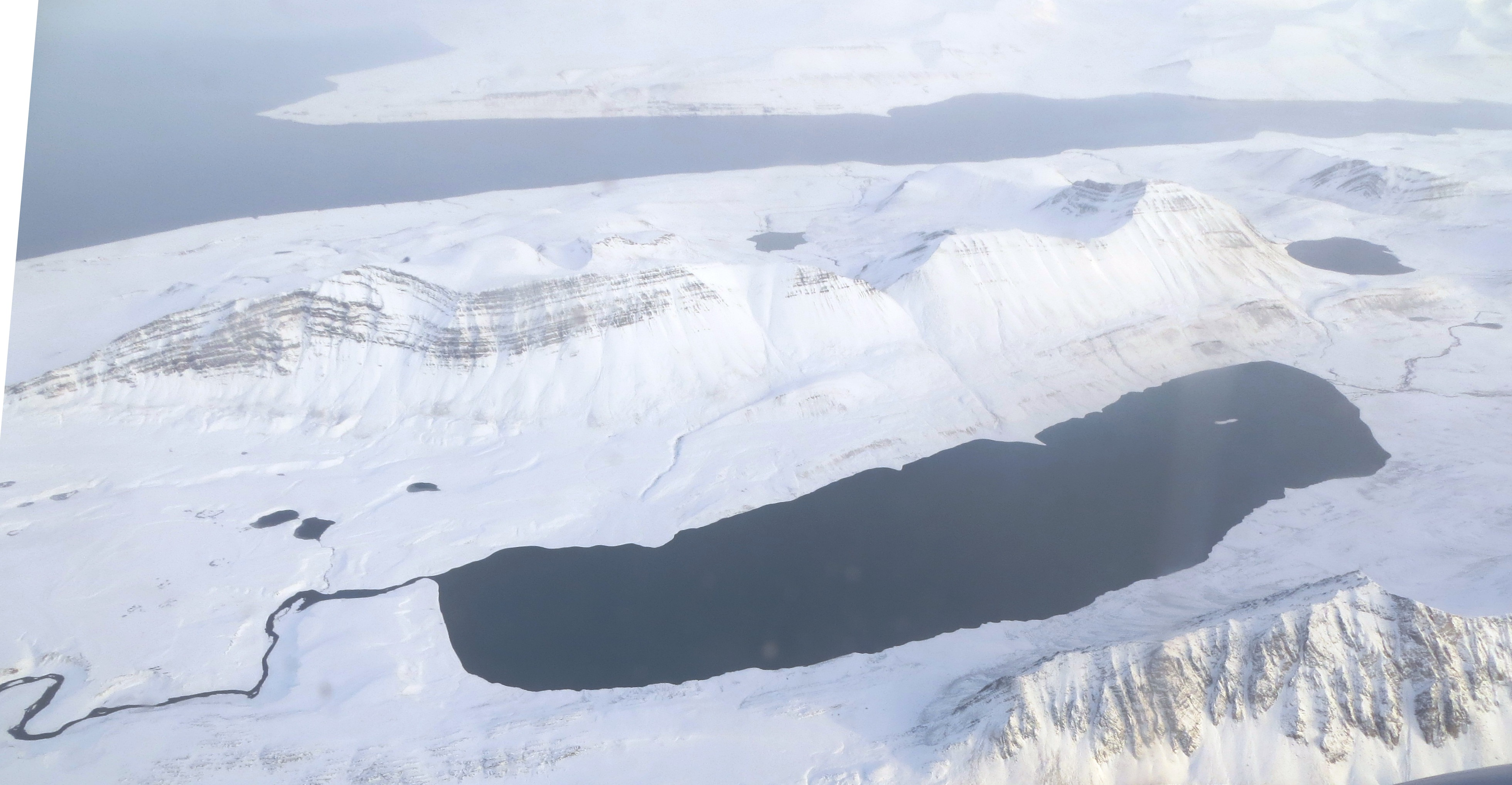

- Location in Svalbard
- Location: Nordenskiöld Land at Spitsbergen, Svalbard
- Coordinates: 78.045°N 13.810°E
- Type: natural freshwater lake
- Basin countries: Norway

Linnévatnet is a lake in Nordenskiöld Land at Spitsbergen, Svalbard. It is situated in the lower part of the Linnédalen valley and measures approximately 4.5 kilometers in length. The lake is one of the largest lakes in Spitsbergen. It is named after the Swedish botanist Carl Linnaeus.
