= Linnédalen =

Valley of Spitsbergen, Norway

Coordinates: 78.01°N 13.88°E

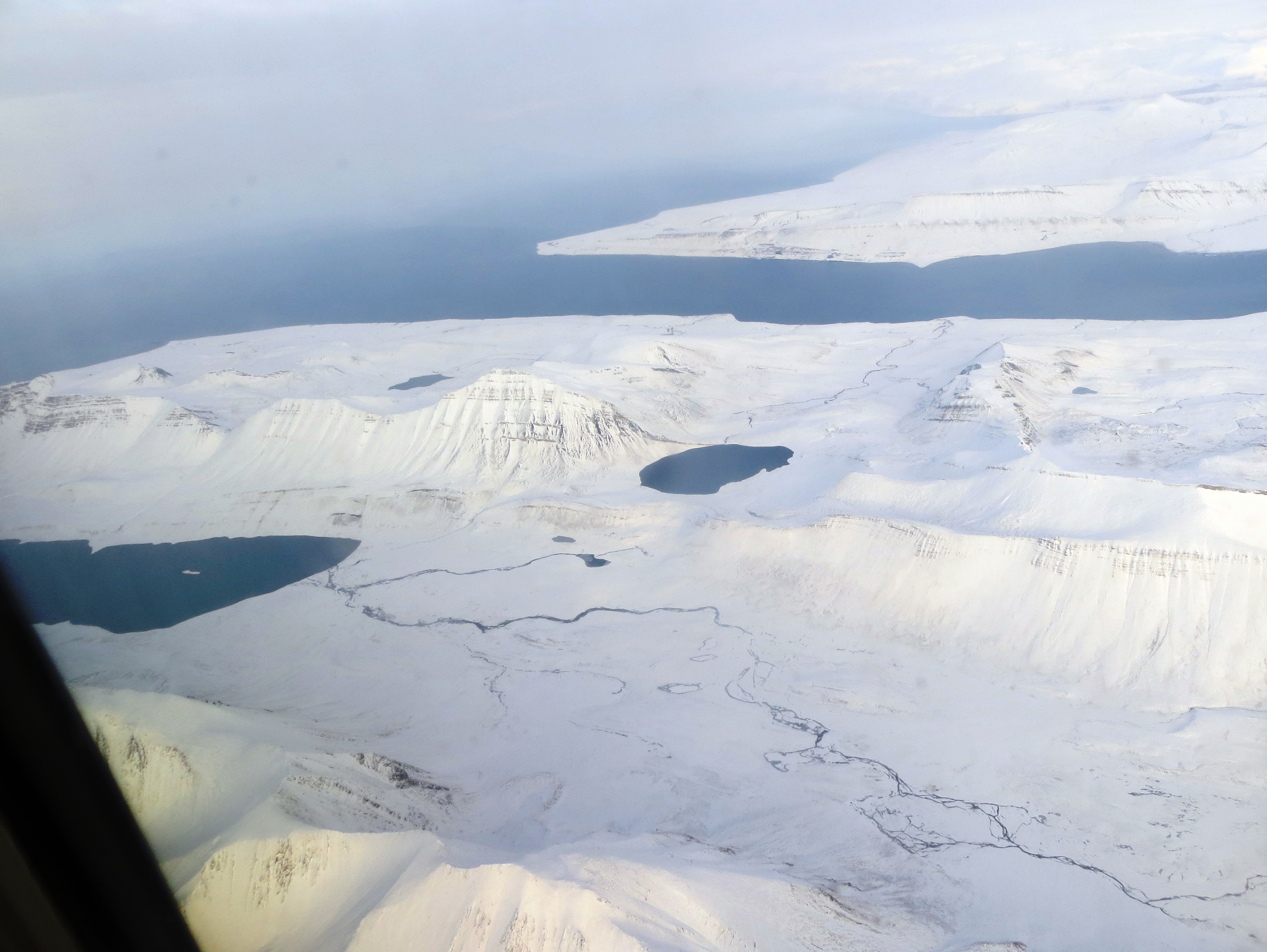
From Linnédalen.

Linnédalen is a valley in Nordenskiöld Land at Spitsbergen, Svalbard. It is named after Swedish botanist Carl Linnaeus. The valley has a length of about ten kilometers, and is located east of the mountain ridge of Linnéfjella. In the lower part of the valley is the lake of Linnévatnet, which is among the largest lakes of Spitsbergen.
