= List of national parks of Norway =

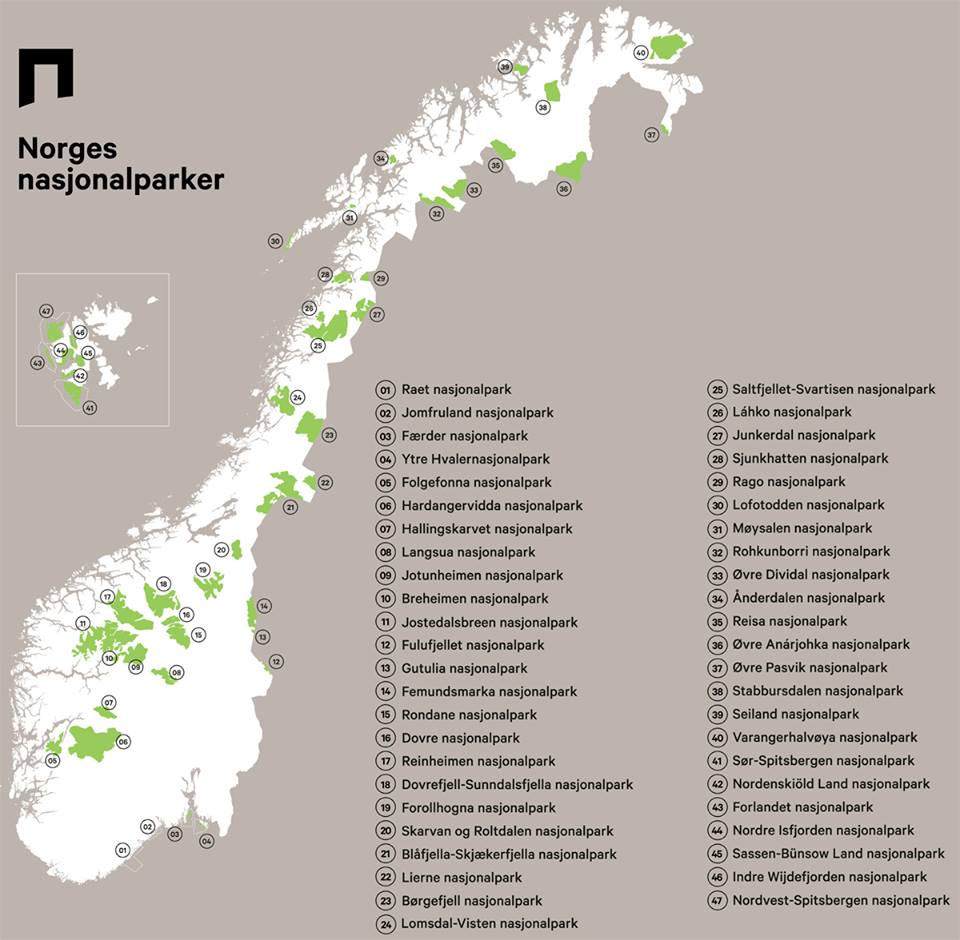
Map of national parks in 2018

National parks (green), nature reserves (purple), geotope protection areas (orange) and bird sanctuaries of Svalbard

Norway has 48 national parks, of which 41 are on the mainland and 7 on Svalbard. National parks in Norway are stricter than many other countries, and nearly all motorized vehicles are prohibited. The Right to roam applies, thus hiking, skiing and camping throughout the park are permitted, given that consideration to nature is taken. Roads, accommodation and national park centers are located outside the national parks. The parks are under the management of the Norwegian Environment Agency and the local county governor.

Ytre Hvaler is a marine park and all parks in Svalbard also contain marine areas. Sør-Spitsbergen is the largest park, covering an area of 13,286 km^{2} (5,130 sq mi), although only 5,141 km^{2} (1,985 sq mi) is land. The newest national park assigned in Norway is Østmarka established in 2023. The largest park on the mainland is Hardangervidda, which covers an area of 3,422 km^{2} (1,321 sq mi). Gutulia is the smallest, covering 23 km^{2} (8.9 sq mi).

== Geography and history ==
At least 60% of Norway's area is mountainous, lakes or bogs (non-arable land, some of it is used as pastures); 37% is forest of various kinds; and only 3% arable land. It is estimated that between 1900 and 2003 areas more than 5 km from intense construction activity have decreased from 48% to 12% in Norway.

Until about one hundred years ago there was relatively little threat to ecosystems in Norway. The first initiatives to protect land were voiced in 1904, by Yngvar Nielsen, leader of the Norwegian Mountain Touring Association (DNT). The association continued to lobby cases in 1923 and 1938. The natural protection act of 1954 prepared a legal basis for establishing protection areas, and the two first national parks were established in 1962 and 1963. The act of 1954 also established Statens naturvernråd ("Governmental Natural protection council") as an advisory body for the government. The council presented a draft for further natural protecting in 1964, suggesting 16 national parks. These suggestions were approved by Stortinget. It took 25 years, until 1989, before 15 of their suggestions were fulfilled. The 16th suggestion became a naturreservat. The council presented another suggestion in 1986, and this was approved by Stortinget in April 1993. Following this approval, a "second generation" of national parks, as well as expanding borders for the elder, were established from 2001.

The post-industrial era that started in the late 1960s saw areas being protected as national parks or other protected status as a means to regulate the construction of vacation homes, roads, fishing, hunting, and gathering plants. This trend has accelerated in the last 10 years. In addition to preserving rare plant and animal life, areas are protected to maintain reference points for environmental research, recreational resources for Norwegians, and as an inheritance for future generations. The Directorate for Nature Management maintains indicators for the health of nature in Norway, including such measures as biological diversity, erosion, signs of pollution.

For the most part, national parks are open to hiking, cross-country skiing and camping. Most have a limited number of overnight cabins.

In addition to national parks, the Norwegian government has designated larger areas for protection. Included in these areas are 153 landscapes covering 14071 km^{2}; 1,701 nature reserves covering 3,418 km^{2}; 24 national parks covering 21,650 km^{2}; 102 natural memorials, and 98 smaller protected areas. This accounts for 12.1% of Norway's mainland area.

The Norwegian government's goal is to increase this area over time to at least 15%. They have signalled an interest in preserving marine ecosystems, including the fjords of the western parts of Norway, and the archipelago southwest from Oslo.

== Current ==
Image	Name	County(s)	Est.	Area	Description	Ref
	Anárjohka	Finnmark	1975	1,390 km^{2} (540 sq mi)		
	Ånderdalen	Troms	1970	134 km^{2} (52 sq mi)		
	Blåfjella–Skjækerfjella	Nord-Trøndelag	2004	1,924 km^{2} (743 sq mi)		
	Breheimen	Oppland, Sogn og Fjordane	2009	1,671 km^{2} (645 sq mi)		
	Børgefjell	Nord-Trøndelag, Nordland	1963	1,447 km^{2} (559 sq mi)		
	Dovre	Oppland	2003	289 km^{2} (112 sq mi)		
	Dovrefjell–Sunndalsfjella	Møre og Romsdal, Oppland, Sør-Trøndelag	1974	1,693 km^{2} (654 sq mi)		
	Færder	Vestfold	2013	350 km^{2} (140 sq mi)		
	Femundsmarka	Hedmark, Sør-Trøndelag	1971	573 km^{2} (221 sq mi)		
	Folgefonna	Hordaland	2005	545 km^{2} (210 sq mi)		
	Forlandet	Svalbard	1973	4,647 km^{2} (1,794 sq mi)	The park covers the uninhabited island of Prins Karls Forland and the surrounding waters. Forlandet is long and narrow with tall peaks, separated in two by the low Forlandsletta. It is the northernmost habitat of harbor seal and a nesting place for common guillemot. Wetland birds nest at Plankeholmane and Forlandsøyane, and the west coast is an overwintering site for seabirds.	
	Forollhogna	Sør-Trøndelag, Hedmark	2001	1,062 km^{2} (410 sq mi)		
	Fulufjellet	Hedmark	2012	83 km^{2} (32 sq mi)		
	Gutulia	Hedmark	1968	23 km^{2} (8.9 sq mi)		
	Hallingskarvet	Buskerud, Hordaland	2006	450 km^{2} (170 sq mi)		
	Hardangervidda	Buskerud, Hordaland, Telemark	1981	3,422 km^{2} (1,321 sq mi)		
	Indre Wijdefjorden	Svalbard	2005	1,127 km^{2} (435 sq mi)	Located in a steep fjord landscape in northern Spitsbergen, the park covers the inner part of Wijdefjorden—the longest fjord on Svalbard. On both sides of Wijdefjorden there is High Arctic steppe vegetation, dominated by grasses and extremely dry, basic earth. Along with vegetation found on nesting cliffs, it is the most exclusive flora in Svalbard. Of the larger fjords on Svalbard, Wijdefjorden is the least affected by humans.	
	Jomfruland	Telemark	2016	117 km^{2} (45 sq mi)		
	Jostedalsbreen	Sogn og Fjordane	1991	1,310 km^{2} (510 sq mi)		
	Jotunheimen	Oppland, Sogn og Fjordane	1980	1,151 km^{2} (444 sq mi)		
	Junkerdal	Nordland	2004	682 km^{2} (263 sq mi)		
	Làhku	Nordland	2012	188 km^{2} (73 sq mi)		
	Langsua	Oppland	2011	537 km^{2} (207 sq mi)		
—	Lierne	Nordland	2004	333 km^{2} (129 sq mi)		
	Lofotodden	Nordland	2018	99 km^{2} (38 sq mi)		
	Lomsdal–Visten	Nordland	2009	682 km^{2} (263 sq mi)		
	Møysalen	Nordland	2003	51 km^{2} (20 sq mi)		
	Nordre Isfjorden	Svalbard	2003	2,954 km^{2} (1,141 sq mi)	Protecting the northern shore of Isfjorden on Spitsbergen, the park consists of a long shoreline with lush vegetation serving as breeding grounds for birds. The landscape varies from the barren and lunar-like to sandy plains and several meter-thick layers of deposits.	
	Nordvest-Spitsbergen	Svalbard	1973	9,914 km^{2} (3,828 sq mi)	The northwestern part of Spitsbergen has the archipelago's most varied nature and features some of the most important cultural heritage sites from whaling and Arctic exploration, such as Smeerenburg and Virgohamna. The park is habitat for Arctic fox, reindeer and Arctic char. Moffen Nature Reserve and three bird sanctuaries (Guissezholmen, Moseøya and Skorpa) are important breeding grounds for birds, especially eider and geese. The warm springs of Bockfjorden give a unique local flora.	
	Østmarka	Oslo, Viken	2023	54 km^{2} (21 sq mi)		
	Øvre Dividal	Troms	1971	750 km^{2} (290 sq mi)		
	Øvre Pasvik	Finnmark	1970	119 km^{2} (46 sq mi)	Part of Pasvik–Inari Trilateral Park, the area is dominated by Siberian-like taiga consisting of old-growth Scots pine, shallow lakes and bog. The traditional Skolts area is still used for reindeer husbandry. The park located in Pasvikdalen and is a habitat for brown bear and moose.	
	Raet	Aust-Agder	2016	607 km^{2} (234 sq mi)		
	Rago	Nordland	1971	171 km^{2} (66 sq mi)		
	Reinheimen	Oppland, Møre og Romsdal	2006	1,969 km^{2} (760 sq mi)		
	Reisa	Troms	1986	803 km^{2} (310 sq mi)		
	Rohkunborri	Troms	2011	571 km^{2} (220 sq mi)		
	Rondane	Hedmark, Oppland	1962	963 km^{2} (372 sq mi)		
	Saltfjellet–Svartisen	Nordland	1989	2,192 km^{2} (846 sq mi)		
	Sassen–Bünsow Land	Svalbard	2003	1,230 km^{2} (470 sq mi)	The park covers Tempelfjorden, Bünsow Land and the vast fluvial plain of Sassendalen, located at the head of Isfjorden. Tempelfjorden is an important breeding ground for ringed seals, while Sassendalen and Gipsdalen are important breeding grounds for geese. Bünsow Land has the only European occurrence of polar mouse-ear (Cerastium regelii) and broad-sepal saxifrage (Saxifraga platysepala).	
	Seiland	Finnmark	2006	316 km^{2} (122 sq mi)		
	Sjunkhatten	Nordland	2010	417 km^{2} (161 sq mi)		
	Skarvan and Roltdalen	Nord-Trøndelag, Sør-Trøndelag	2004	441 km^{2} (170 sq mi)		
	Sør-Spitsbergen	Svalbard	1973	13,286 km^{2} (5,130 sq mi)	Covering the southern part of Spitsbergen (Wedel Jarlsberg Land, Torell Land and Sørkapp Land), the western part has jagged mountains while the eastern part is more rounded. Hornsund is an important migration area for polar bears, while four bird sanctuaries (Olsholmen, Isøyane, Dunøyane and Sørkapp) are vital nesting grounds for migratory seabirds.	
	Stabbursdalen	Finnmark	1970	747 km^{2} (288 sq mi)		
	Van Mijenfjorden	Svalbard	2021	4,251 km^{2} (1,641 sq mi)		
	Varangerhalvøya	Finnmark	2006	1,804 km^{2} (697 sq mi)		
	Ytre Hvaler	Østfold	2009	354 km^{2} (137 sq mi)		

== Former ==
Name	County	Established	Disestablished	Area (land, km^{2})	Area (land, sq mi)	Replaced by	Ref
Gressåmoen	Nord-Trøndelag	1970	2004	182	70	Blåfjella–Skjækerfjella	
Ormtjernkampen	Oppland	1968	2011	9	3	Langsua	
Nordenskiöld Land	Svalbard	2003	2021	1,362	526	Van Mijenfjorden	

== Planned ==
National park	County	Size km^{2}	Outdoor recreational facilities provided	Status
Dåapma	Nord-Trøndelag	261		Cancelled in 2013 after municipalities and reindeer herders pulled out of the process.
Muvrrešáhpi	Finnmark	291	No	Cancelled in 2015 after strong local opposition.
Preikestolen	Rogaland	215	Marked trails	Under consideration in 2019.
Treriksrøysa	Troms	?	Unmarked trails and a hut.	Cancelled in 2015 after strong local opposition. Reproposed in 2019.
Tysfjord–Hellemobotn	Nordland	~1000	Boat to Hellemobotn	Cancelled in 2015 after strong local opposition.

There are also several national park proposals by many different parties: Solværøyene, Storheia; Melkevatn–Hjertvatn–Børsvatn, Okstindan; Frafjordheiene; Oksøy-Ryvingen; Setesdal Vesthei, Trollheimen, Lyngsalpan; Mølen.

Storheia has since been covered in a wind farm and would no longer qualify for protection as a national park, and parts of Melkevatn–Hjertvatn–Børsvatn were protected as a nature reserve rather than a national park.

After being tasked by the Ministry of Climate and Environment in 2018 to find areas that should be protected, in 2019 the Environment Agency made a number of suggestions for new national parks as well as expansions of existing ones, after looking through suggestions from the county governors. In 2021, after meetings with the affected municipalities, they made a final list of suggestions for national parks that should get further consideration. The proposed new protections are: Sunnmørsalpane, Hornelen, Masfjordfjella and Øystesefjella. Additionally, they proposed some protected areas to be changed to national park: Lyngsalpan, Sylan, Trollheimen and Innerdalen, Ålfotbreen, Oksøy-Ryvingen, and Flekkefjord and Listastrendene. Many other proposals were cancelled due to local opposition: Kvænangsvidda-Nabar, Treriksrøysa, Preikestolen, Kvitladalen-Bjordalen, Viglesdalen; as well as some proposed changes of type of protection: Naustdal-Gjengedal and Setesdal Vesthei Ryfylkeheiane.
