= List of protected areas of Svalbard =

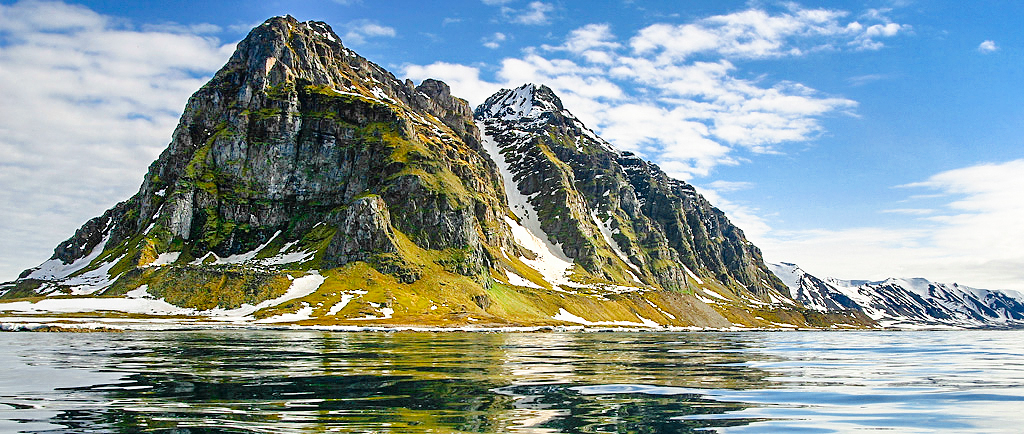
The northernmost tip of Prins Karls Forland in Forlandet National Park

Map of protected areas of Svalbard. National parks in green, nature reserves in purple, geotope protection areas in orange, bird sanctuaries with a bird icon, islands in black and seas in blue.

Svalbard is an Arctic wilderness archipelago comprising the northernmost part of Norway. There are twenty-nine protected natural areas, consisting of seven national parks, six nature reserves, fifteen bird sanctuaries and one geotope protected area. In addition, human traces dating from before 1946 are automatically protected. The protected areas make up 39,800 square kilometers (15,400 sq mi) or 65% of the land area, and 78,000 square kilometers (30,000 sq mi) or 86.5% of the territorial waters. The largest protected areas are Nordaust-Svalbard Nature Reserve and Søraust-Svalbard Nature Reserve, which cover most of the areas east of the main island of Spitsbergen, including the islands of Nordaustlandet, Edgeøya, Barentsøya, Kong Karls Land and Kvitøya. Six of the national parks are located on Spitsbergen. Ten of the bird sanctuaries and the Moffen Nature Reserve are located within national parks. Five of the bird sanctuaries are Ramsar sites and fourteen of the bird sanctuaries are islands. Svalbard is on Norway's tentative list for nomination as a UNESCO World Heritage Site.

The supreme responsibility for conservation lies with the Norwegian Ministry of the Environment, which has delegated the management to the Governor of Svalbard and the Norwegian Directorate for Nature Management. The foundation for conservation was established in the Svalbard Treaty of 1920, and has been further specified in the Svalbard Environmental Act of 2001. The first round of protection took force on 1 July 1973, when most of the current protected areas came into effect. This included the two large nature reserves and three of the national parks. Moffen Nature Reserve was established in 1983, followed by four national parks, three nature reserves and one geotope protection area between 2002 and 2005.

Two primarily terrestrial mammalian species inhabit the archipelago: the Arctic fox and the Svalbard reindeer. There are 15 to 20 types of marine mammals, including whales, dolphins, seals, walruses, and polar bears. About 30 types of bird are found on Svalbard, most of which are migratory. The Barents Sea is among the areas in the world with most seabirds, with about 20 million individuals during late summer. Sixteen bird species are on the IUCN Red List. In particular, Bjørnøya, Storfjorden, Nordvest-Spitsbergen and Hopen are important breeding grounds for seabirds. Svalbard has permafrost and tundra, with both low, middle and high Arctic vegetation. There have been found 165 species of plants on the archipelago, although vegetation only covers 10% of the island group. Low precipitation gives the archipelago a steppe climate; however plants still have good access to water because the cold climate reduces evaporation. The growing season is very short, and may last only for a few weeks.

== National parks, nature reserves and geotope protection areas ==
The following lists contains all national parks, nature reserves and geotope protection areas in Svalbard. It includes the protected areas' name, type, total size, size of the land area and size of the marine area, excluding freshwater, in square kilometers and square miles.

Area	Type	Established	Size km^{2}	Size sq mi	Land km^{2}	Land sq mi	Marine km^{2}	Marine sq mi	Ref
Bjørnøya Nature Reserve	Nature reserve	16 August 2002	2,981.3	1,151.1	177	68	2,805	1,083	
Festningen Geotope Protected Area	Geotope protection area	26 September 2003	16.6	6.4	14	5	3	1	
Forlandet National Park	National park	1 July 1973	4,626.8	1,786.4	616	238	4,018	1,551	
Hopen Nature Reserve	Nature reserve	26 September 2003	3,185.6	1,230.0	46	18	3,140	1,210	
Indre Wijdefjorden National Park	National park	9 September 2005	1,127.1	435.2	745	288	382	147	
Moffen Nature Reserve	Nature reserve	3 June 1983	8.8	3.4	5	2	4	2	
Nordaust-Svalbard Nature Reserve	Nature reserve	1 July 1973	55,354.3	21,372.4	18,663	7,206	36,691	14,166	
Nordenskiöld Land National Park	National park	26 September 2003	1,362.3	526.0	155	60	1,207	466	
Nordre Isfjorden National Park	National park	26 September 2003	2,952.1	1,139.8	2,050	790	904	349	
Nordvest-Spitsbergen National Park	National park	1 July 1973	9,870.5	3,811.0	3,684	1,422	6,189	2,390	
Ossian Sars Nature Reserve	Nature reserve	26 September 2003	12.1	4.7	12	5	0	0	
Sassen-Bünsow Land National Park	National park	26 September 2003	1,230.5	475.1	1,157	447	73	28	
Søraust-Svalbard Nature Reserve	Nature reserve	1 July 1973	21,825.9	8,427.0	15,426	5,956	25,436	9,821	
Sør-Spitsbergen National Park	National park	1 July 1973	13,177.3	5,087.8	5,030	1,940	8,198	3,165	

== Bird sanctuaries ==
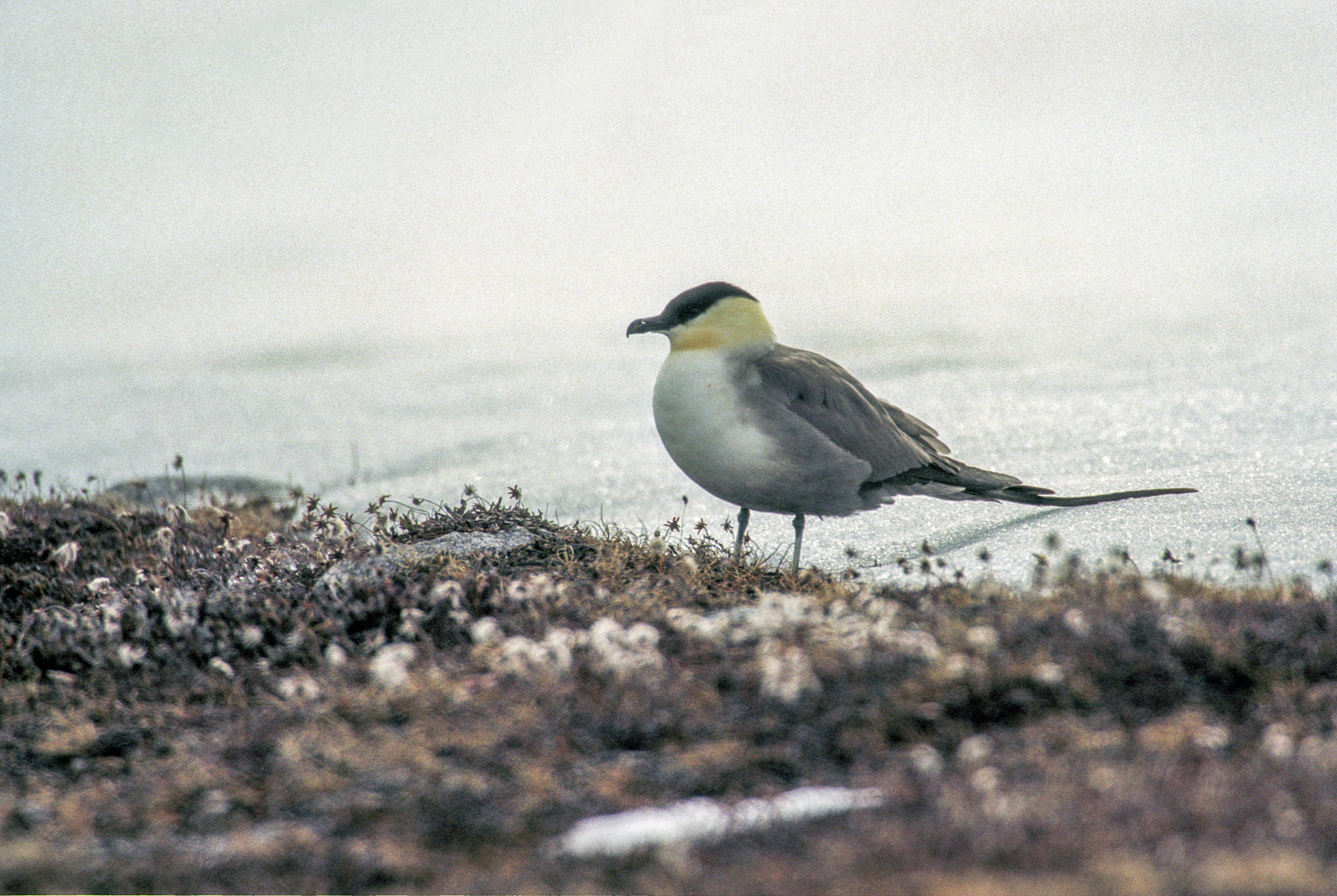
Long-tailed skua

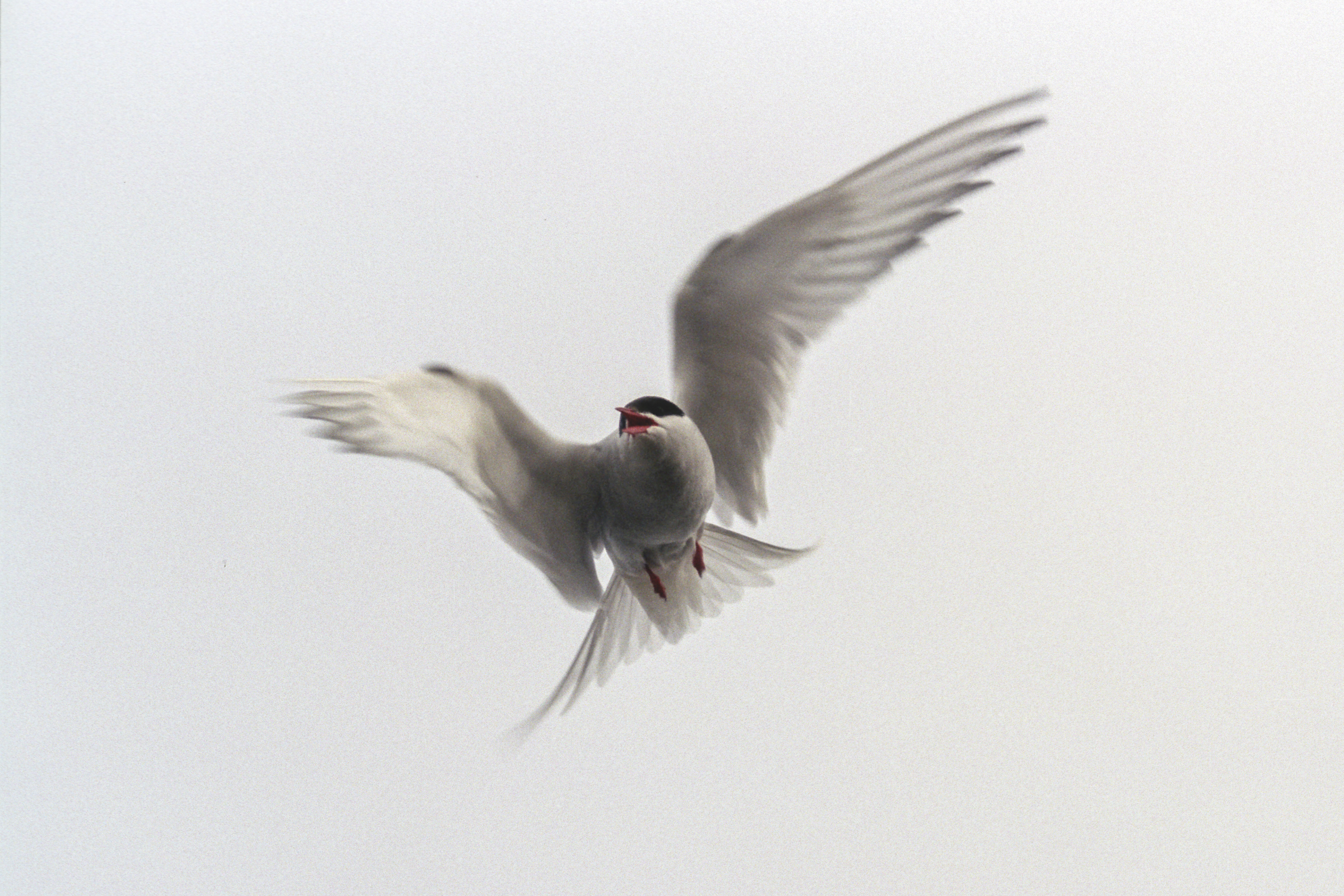
Arctic tern

The following lists contains all bird sanctuaries in Svalbard. It includes the sanctuaries' names and total size in square kilometers and square miles. Bird sanctuaries that are also Ramsar sites are indicated. All bird sanctuaries were established on 1 July 1973.

^{†}	Ramsar sites

Area	Size km^{2}	Size sq mi	Ref
Blomstrandhamna Bird Sanctuary	0.6	0.23	
Boheman Bird Sanctuary	2.1	0.81	
Dunøyane Bird Sanctuary^{†}	11.9	4.6	
Forlandsøyane Bird Sanctuary^{†}	5.4	2.1	
Gåsøyane Bird Sanctuary^{†}	2.4	0.93	
Guissezholmen Bird Sanctuary	0.4	0.15	
Hermansen Island Bird Sanctuary	4.2	1.6	
Isøyane Bird Sanctuary^{†}	2.3	0.89	
Kapp Linné Bird Sanctuary	1.9	0.73	
Kongsfjorden Bird Sanctuary^{†}	7.1	2.7	
Moseøya Bird Sanctuary	1.4	0.54	
Olsholmen Bird Sanctuary	0.5	0.19	
Plankeholmane Bird Sanctuary	1.6	0.62	
Skorpa Bird Sanctuary	1.1	0.42	
Sørkapp Bird Sanctuary	36.0	13.9	
