= Arctic desert =

Ecoregion in Arctic Ocean

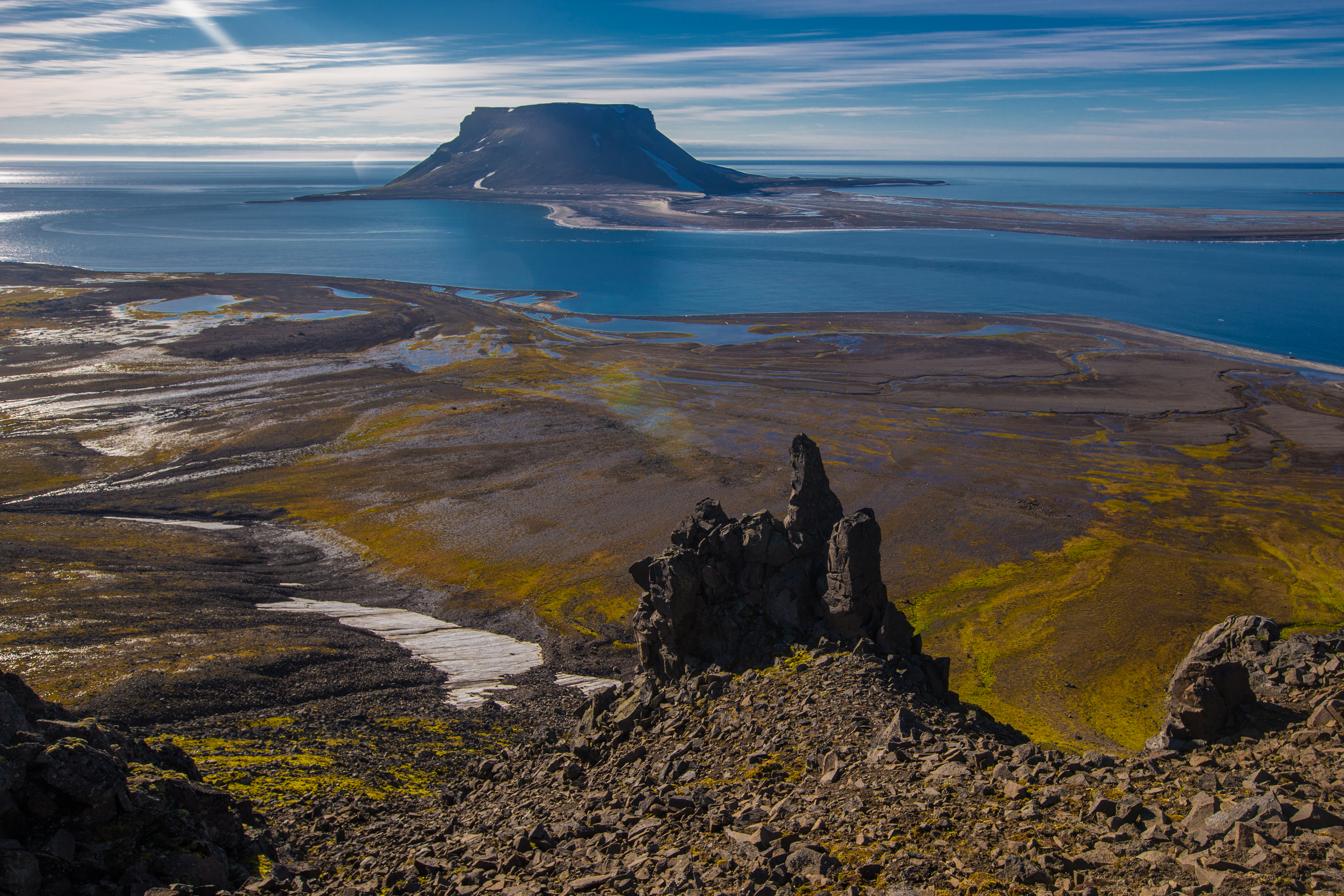
- Bell Island, Franz Josef Land

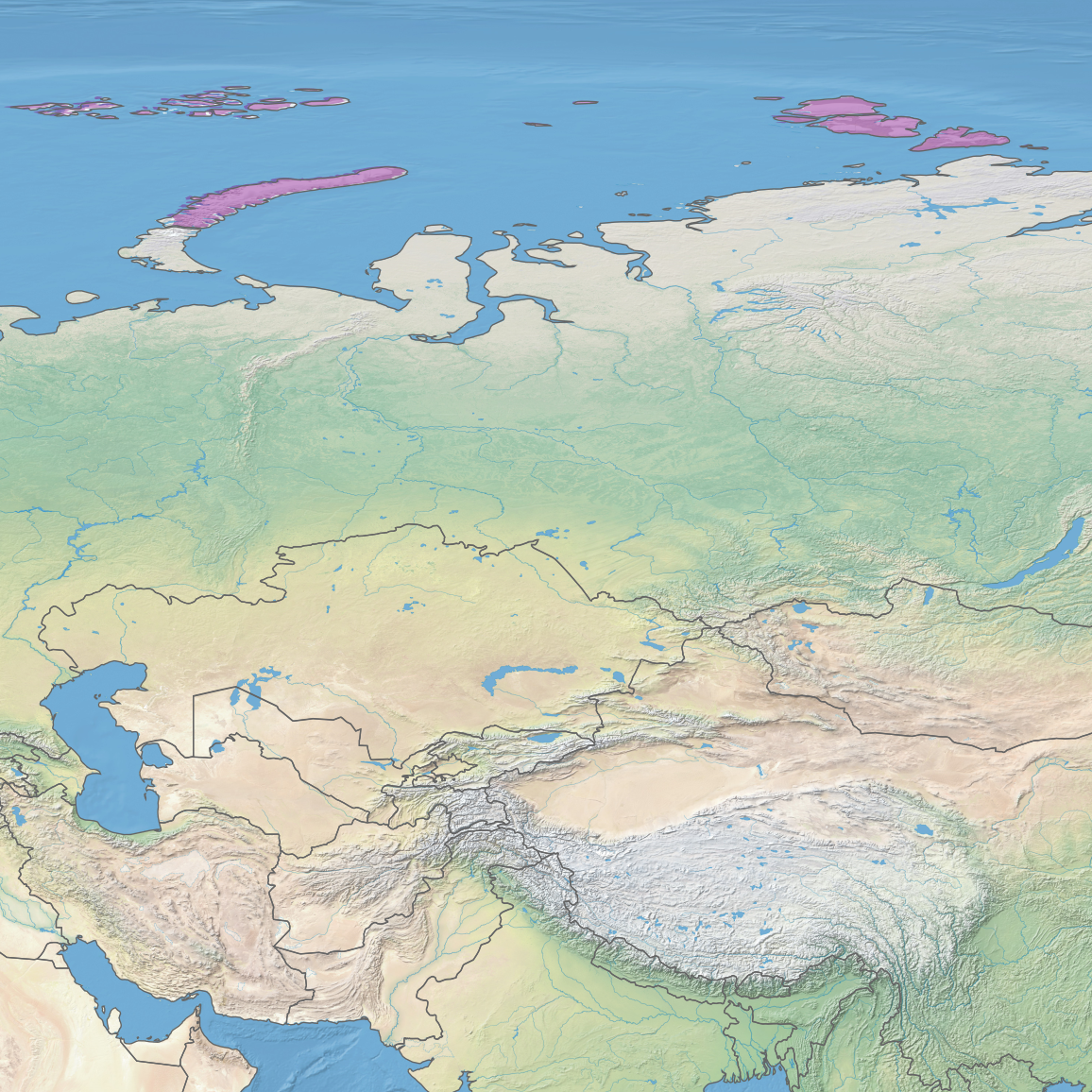
- Ecoregion territory (in purple)

Ecology
- Realm: Palearctic
- Biome: Tundra

Geography
- Area: 161,400 km^{2} (62,300 sq mi)
- Countries: Norway; Russia
- Coordinates: 81°N 55°E

The Arctic desert ecoregion (WWF ID: PA1101) is a terrestrial ecoregion that covers the island groups of Svalbard, Franz Josef Land, Severny Island and Severnaya Zemlya in the Arctic Ocean, above 75 degrees north latitude. The region is covered with glaciers, snow, and bare rock in a harshly cold environment. The temperature does rise above freezing for short periods in the summer, so some ice melt occurs, and the area supports colonies of sea birds and mammals. It has an area of 161,400 square kilometres (62,300 sq mi).

== Location and description ==
The ecoregion stretches 2,000 km west-to-east, and 1,000 km north-to-south, across the Arctic Ocean north of Norway and Russia. It covers the island groups of Svalbard (Norway), Franz Josef Land (Russia), Severny Island (Russia), and Severnaya Zemlya (Russia).

== Climate ==
The region has a Tundra (Koppen classification ET). This climate is characterized by long, cold winters and very short summers with at least one month averaging over 0 °C (32 °F) so that snow or ice might melt, but no month averages over 10 °C (50 °F). Mean precipitation at the Ernst Krenkel Observatory in Franz Josef Land has, since 1961, averaged 294 mm/year, with mean temperatures of −25.6 °C (−14.1 °F) in January, and 0.8 °C (33.4 °F) in July.

== Flora and fauna ==
Plant life is scarce due to the cold climate, but there is moss and lichen vegetation on 5-10% of the territory at low elevations and where bare rock or soil exists. The largest colonies of Ivory gull are found in the region, as well as Atlantic walrus and Polar bear.

== Protections ==
Over 36% of the ecoregion is in an officially protected area, including all or a portion of:

- Forlandet National Park (Norway), covering Prins Karls Forland (island).
- Nordaust-Svalbard Nature Reserve (Norway), covering many islands in the Svalbard archipelago, much of which is glaciated,
- Nordvest-Spitsbergen National Park (Norway), covering the northwestern portion of Spitsbergen island.
- Nordre Isfjorden National Park (Norway), covering a fjord in central Spitzbergen
- Russian Arctic National Park (Russia), covering Franz Josef Land, the northern tip of Severnaya Zemly, and other islands.
- Sør-Spitsbergen National Park (Norway), covering the southern portion of Spitsbergen island.
- Søraust-Svalbard Nature Reserve (Norway), covering the southeastern portion of the Svalbard archipelago.

== See also ==
- List of ecoregions in Russia
- List of ecoregions in Europe
