= Isøyane =

Island group in Svalbard, Norway

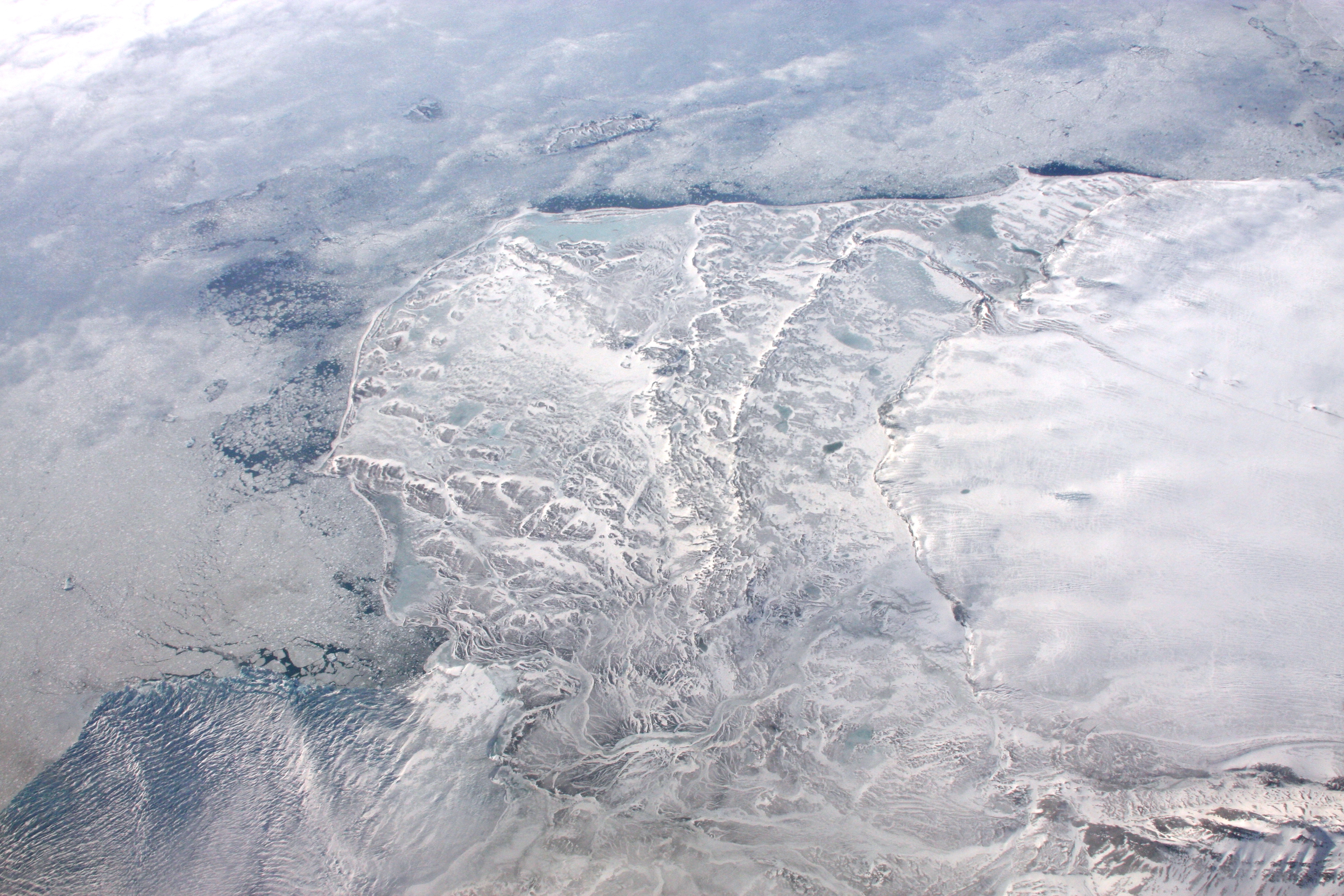
- Torellbreen and Isøyane
- Interactive map of Isøyane

Geography
- Location: Arctic Ocean
- Coordinates: 77.1331°N 14.8232°E
- Archipelago: Svalbard

Administration
- Norway

Demographics
- Population: 0

Designations

Ramsar Wetland
- Designated: 24 July 1985
- Reference no.: 316

Isøyane is a group of small islands in Wedel Jarlsberg Land at Spitsbergen, Svalbard. They are located north of Dunøyane at the western coast of Spitsbergen, and is a continuation of the middle moraine ridge of the glacier Torellbreen, with an extension of about 3.5 nautical miles. The largest island is Nordre Isøya. The northernmost islet is called Aurholmen, and to the south are Isøyskjera, a group of skerries and islets. Nordre Isøya and Isøykalven are protected as a bird reserve, with restricted access for the public.
