= Olsholmen =

Island in Svalbard, Norway

Coordinates: 77.2371°N 14.2504°E

Olsholmen is a small island or islet at the west coast of Wedel Jarlsberg Land at Spitsbergen, Svalbard. It is located between the capes Kapp Klaveness and Kapp Borthen. The islet is included in the Olsholmen Bird Sanctuary, which was established in 1973.
