= Skorpa =

Skorpa may refer to:

== Places ==
- Skorpa (Hol), a mountain in Hol municipality, Buskerud county
- Skorpa, Kristiansund, an island in Kristiansund municipality, Møre og Romsdal county
- Skorpa, Møre og Romsdal, an uninhabited island in Herøy municipality, Møre og Romsdal county
- Skorpa, Kinn, an island in Flora municipality, Sogn og Fjordane county
- Skorpa, Troms, an island in Kvænangen municipality, Troms county
- Skorpa prisoner of war camp, a World War II POW camp on Skorpa island in Troms county
- Skorpa Bird Sanctuary, a bird sanctuary in Svalbard, Norway

== Other uses ==
- a Swedish form of rusk
