= Forlandsøyane =

Island in Svalbard, Norway

Coordinates: 78.3454°N 11.5484°E

Designations

Ramsar Wetland
- Designated: 24 July 1985
- Reference no.: 313

Forlandsøyane are three small islands off the southwestern coast of Prins Karls Forland, at the western side of Spitsbergen, Svalbard. The islands are Nordøya, Midtøya and Sørøya. Of these, Midtøya is the largest island. The islands were included in the Forlandsøyane Bird Sanctuary in 1973.
