= Dunøyane =

Island group of Svalbard

Coordinates: 77°03′N 14°53′E

Designations

Ramsar Wetland
- Designated: 24 July 1985
- Reference no.: 314

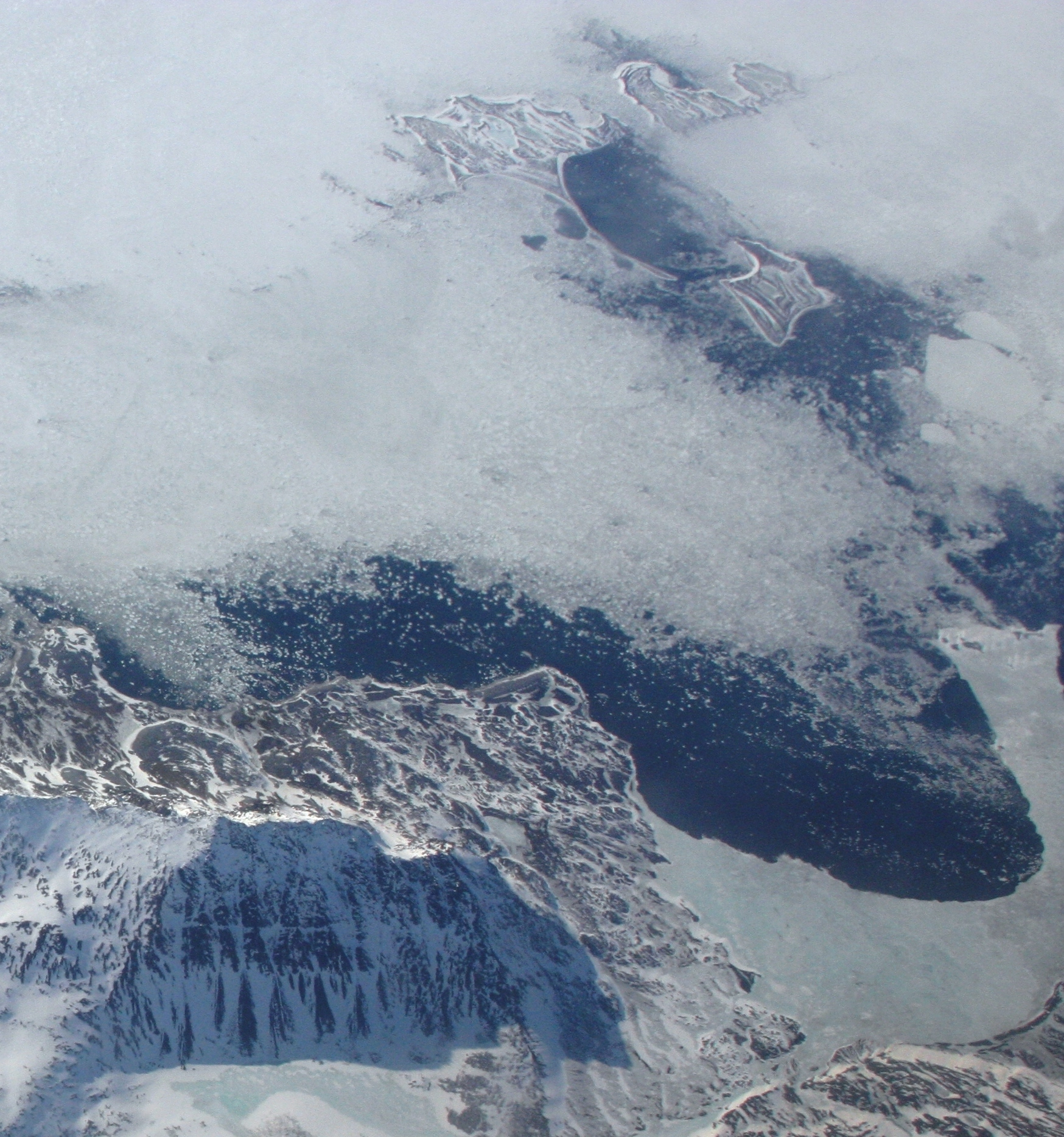
Dunøyane and Dunøysundet.

Dunøyane is a group of islands north of Hornsund, outside Wedel Jarlsberg Land at the western coast of Spitsbergen, Svalbard. The island group is a nesting site for barnacle goose, common eider and Arctic tern. Hunters used to collect eiderdown at the islands. Dunøyane are included in the Dunøyane Bird Sanctuary, and part of the Sør-Spitsbergen National Park.
