= Raudfjellet =

Coordinates: 77.2018°N 15.1035°E

Raudfjellet (The Red Mountain) is a mountain in Wedel Jarlsberg Land at Spitsbergen, Svalbard. It has a height of 1,016 m.a.s.l., and is the largest mountain between Bellsund and Hornsund. The glacier Torellbreen forms an about twenty kilometer long front below the mountain. Raudfjellet is a characteristic landmark with its triple summit and orange colour.
