= Forlandsletta =

Plain in Svalbard, Norway

Forlandsletta (Svalbard)

Forlandsletta is a low-lying plain in the southern part of Prins Karls Forland in Svalbard, Norway. The plain is bounded by Bogtjørna, Methuenfjellet, Tjørnberget and Archibald Geikiebreen in the north to Vassdammen, the northernmost point on Persiskammen and further east to the coast. Forlandsletta is 19 km long, 5–7 km wide and up to 20 m above sea level.

Together with the rest of the island, Forlandsletta is part of the Forlandet National Park, which was established in 1973. The national park contains a varied wildlife, with several significant avifaunas, a small population of Svalbard reindeer, the world's northernmost population of harbor seals and two roosting sites of walruses.

Forlandsletta is named after Prince Karls Forland.
