= Borthen =

Borthen is a surname. Notable people with the surname include:

- Leif Borthen (1911–1979), Norwegian journalist and author
- Martin Borthen (1878–1964), Norwegian sailor
- Ingrid Borthen (1913–2001), Norwegian-born Swedish actress

== See also ==
- Kapp Borthen
