= Fyrsjøen =

Lake in Svalbard

- Location in Svalbard
- Location: Nordenskiöld Land at Spitsbergen, Svalbard
- Coordinates: 78.052°N 13.602°E
- Type: natural freshwater lake
- Basin countries: Norway

Fyrsjøen ("The Lighthouse Lake") is a lake in Nordenskiöld Land at Spitsbergen, Svalbard. It is located at the southern part of the headland Kapp Linné, proximate to the Isfjord Lighthouse.

The area between Fyrsjøen and the bay of Randvika is protected as the Kapp Linné Bird Sanctuary.
