= Festningen Geotope Protected Area =

Protected area in Svalbard, Norway

- IUCN category III (natural monument or feature)
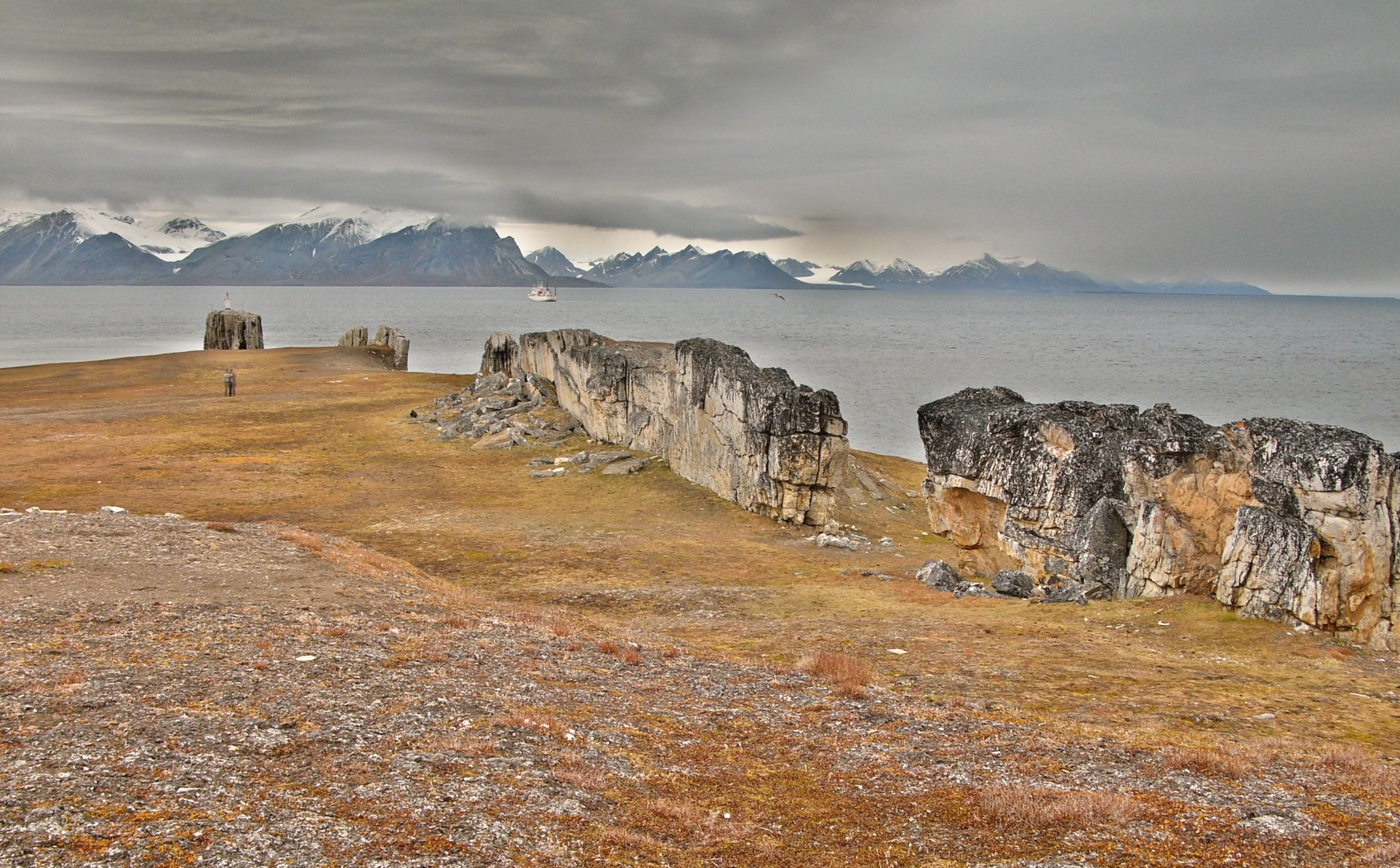

- Location: Svalbard, Norway
- Nearest city: Barentsburg
- Coordinates: 78°5.1′N 13°50.9′E
- Area: 16.6 km^{2} (6.4 sq mi)
- Established: 26 September 2003
- Governing body: Norwegian Directorate for Nature Management

Festningen Geotope Protected Area (Norwegian: Festningen geotopvernområde) is located at the outermost edge of Grønfjorden's mouth to Isfjorden on Nordenskiöld Land, Spitsbergen in Svalbard, Norway. The profile is a cliff which runs along the coast from Kapp Starostin to Festningsodden. It covers an areas of 16.6 square kilometres (6.4 sq mi), of which 14 square kilometres (5.4 sq mi) is on land and 3 square kilometres (1.2 sq mi) in the sea. Barentsburg is the closest settlement, located 6 kilometres (4 mi) away, across Grønfjorden. Festningen was protect on 26 September 2003, as part of a major expansion of the protected areas in Svalbard. The protected areas is administrated by the Norwegian Directorate for Nature Management and the Governor of Svalbard. Festningen ("The Fortress") is a traditional name given by Norwegian hunters to the area because it looked like a natural fortress.

The geotope profile consists of geological succession deposits from several hundred millions of years. It has nearly vertical layers with continual exposure from the Permian period to the Cenozoic era. The stratigraphical features were recorded during the 1910s and 1920s, and are used within geological sciences as a strategic reference profile. Fossilized footprints of an Iguanodon dinosaur, 0.5 metres (1 ft 8 in) in diameter, dating from 100 million years ago, have been found at Festningen. They were 10 to 12 metres (33 to 39 ft) long and 3 to 5 metres (9.8 to 16.4 ft) tall. Located on a cliff, they were highly exposed to erosion; after they were found and copied, the slab fell into the sea.
