= Kapp Borthen =

Headland in Spitsbergen, Svalbard

Coordinates: 77.1713°N 14.4471°E

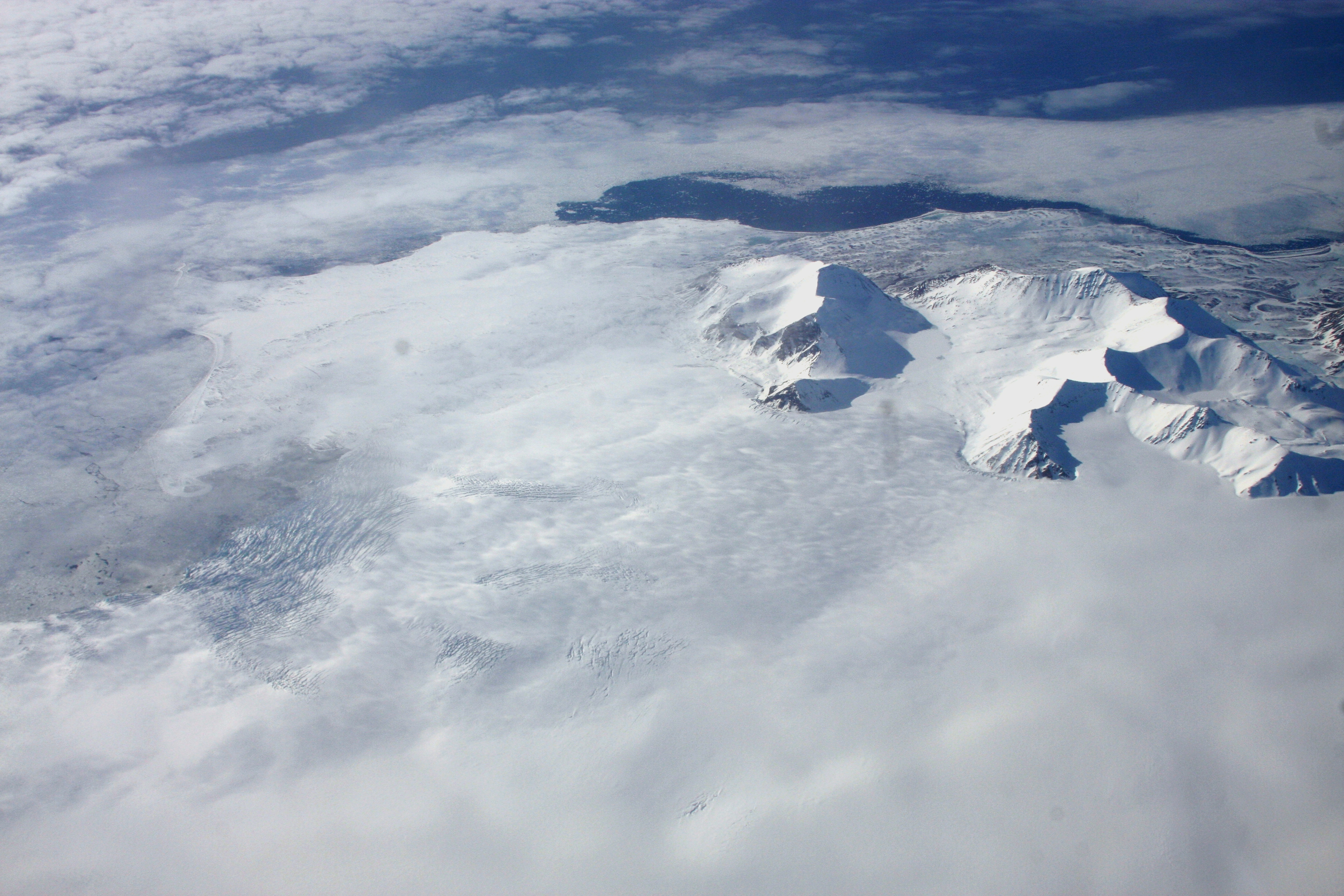
Kapp Borthen (left)

Kapp Borthen is a headland in Wedel Jarlsberg Land at Spitsbergen, Svalbard. It is located at the western coast of Spitsbergen, at the front of the glacier Torellbreen. The headland is named after Norwegian ship-owner Harry Borthen.
