= Vestre Torellbreen =

Glacier in Svalbard, Norway

Coordinates: 77°16.2′N 14°49.4′E

Vestre Torellbreen on a map of Svalbard

Vestre Torellbreen is a glacier in Spitsbergen, Svalbard. It lies to the southwest of Wedel Jarlsberg Land, and runs southward to Isfjellbukta. There was previously a 20 km wide glacier here together with Austre Torellbreen, but after the glacier split, there are now two glaciers each of around one km wide in the area known as Torellmorenen.

The glacier is named after the Swedish geologist and glaciologist Professor Otto Torell (1828-1900)
