= Torellbreen =

Glacier at Spitsbergen, Svalbard, Norway

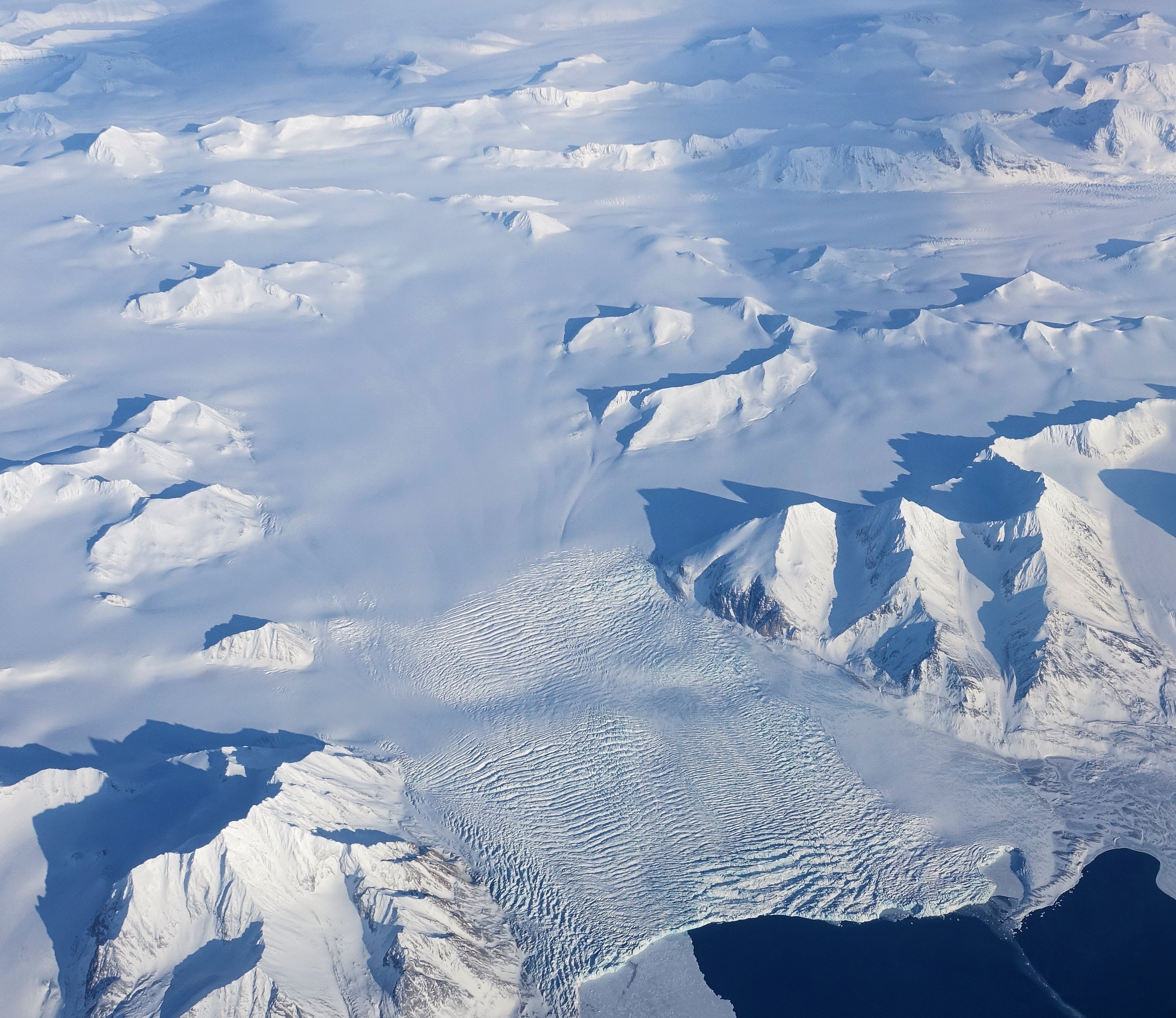
- Austre Torellbreen seen from west

- Location within Svalbard
- Type: Glacier
- Location: Wedel Jarlsberg Land; Spitsbergen, Svalbard
- Coordinates: 77.1817°N 15.0063°E

Torellbreen is a glacier in Wedel Jarlsberg Land at Spitsbergen, Svalbard. It forms a front below the mountain Raudfjellet, with a length of about twenty kilometers, and is a merge of the two glaciers Austre Torellbreen and Vestre Torellbreen. The glacier is named after Swedish scientist Otto Martin Torell.
