= Plankeholmane Bird Sanctuary =

Protected area in Svalbard, Norway

Coordinates: 78.21°N 11.95°E

Plankeholmane Bird Sanctuary (Norwegian: Plankeholmane fuglereservat) is a bird reserve at Svalbard, Norway, established in 1973. It includes Plankeholmane south of Prins Karls Forland, Spitsbergen. The protected area covers a total area of around 1,600,000 square metres.
