= Ormtjernkampen National Park =

Former National park in Norway

- IUCN category II (national park)
- Interactive map of Ormtjernkampen National Park
- Location: Oppland, Norway
- Nearest city: Lillehammer
- Coordinates: 61°12′N 9°48′E
- Area: 9 km^{2} (3.5 sq mi)
- Established: 1968
- Governing body: Directorate for Nature Management

Ormtjernkampen National Park (Norwegian: Ormtjernkampen nasjonalpark) is a former national park located in Gausdal Municipality in Oppland county, Norway. The park was established on 14 June 1968. In 2011, this park was dissolved and its areas were included in the new, much larger Langsua National Park.

During its existence, it was the smallest national park in Norway. It consisted primarily of virgin spruce forest, with some lakes and marshes. It was established to preserve the virgin spruce forest that prevailed in Norway prior to the rise of forestry.

The park bordered the Ormtjernmyra nature reserve.

== Name ==
The last element is the finite form of kamp which can mean 'round mountain'. The first element is the name of the lake Ormtjernet - and this is a compound of orm which means 'snake' (vipera berus) and the finite form of tjern which means 'small lake' or 'tarn'.
