= Dunøysundet =

Bay in Svalbard, Norway

Coordinates: 77°03′N 15°04′E

Dunøysundet is a bay in the Norwegian archipelago of Svalbard. It is located near many other bays such as Nottinghambukta and is located relatively close to Longyearbyen. Most of the islands to the west of it are located within the Dunøyane Bird Sanctuary.

Dunøysundet has a tundra climate, with temperatures rarely exceeding 45 Fahrenheit. It is located well above the Arctic Circle, although it is warmed by sea currents.
