= Langsua National Park =

National park in Norway

- IUCN category II (national park)
- Interactive map of Langsua National Park
- Location: Innlandet, Norway
- Nearest city: Lillehammer
- Coordinates: 61.2°N 9.5°E
- Area: 537.1 km^{2} (207.4 sq mi)
- Established: 11 March 2011
- Governing body: Norwegian Directorate for Nature Management

Langsua National Park (Norwegian: Langsua nasjonalpark) was established in 2011. The park consists of a total protected area of 537.1-square-kilometre (207.4 sq mi). It is located in Innlandet county in Norway, and covers parts of the municipalities Øystre Slidre, Nord-Aurdal, Nordre Land, Gausdal, Sør-Fron and Nord-Fron.

== History ==
The Langsua National Park was established in 2011, covering 537.1 km^{2} (207.4 sq mi), a significant extension of the Ormtjernkampen National Park from 1968.

== Adjacent protected areas ==
The Langsua National Park borders to a number of adjacent protected areas, covering a total of 1,000.4 km^{2} (386.3 sq mi), including the national park itself. The adjacent areas are the Hersjømyrin, Kjølaåne, Røssjøen, Skardberga, Oppsjømyra and Hynna nature reserves, and the Haldorbu, Storlægeret, Dokkfaret and Espedalen landscape protection areas.

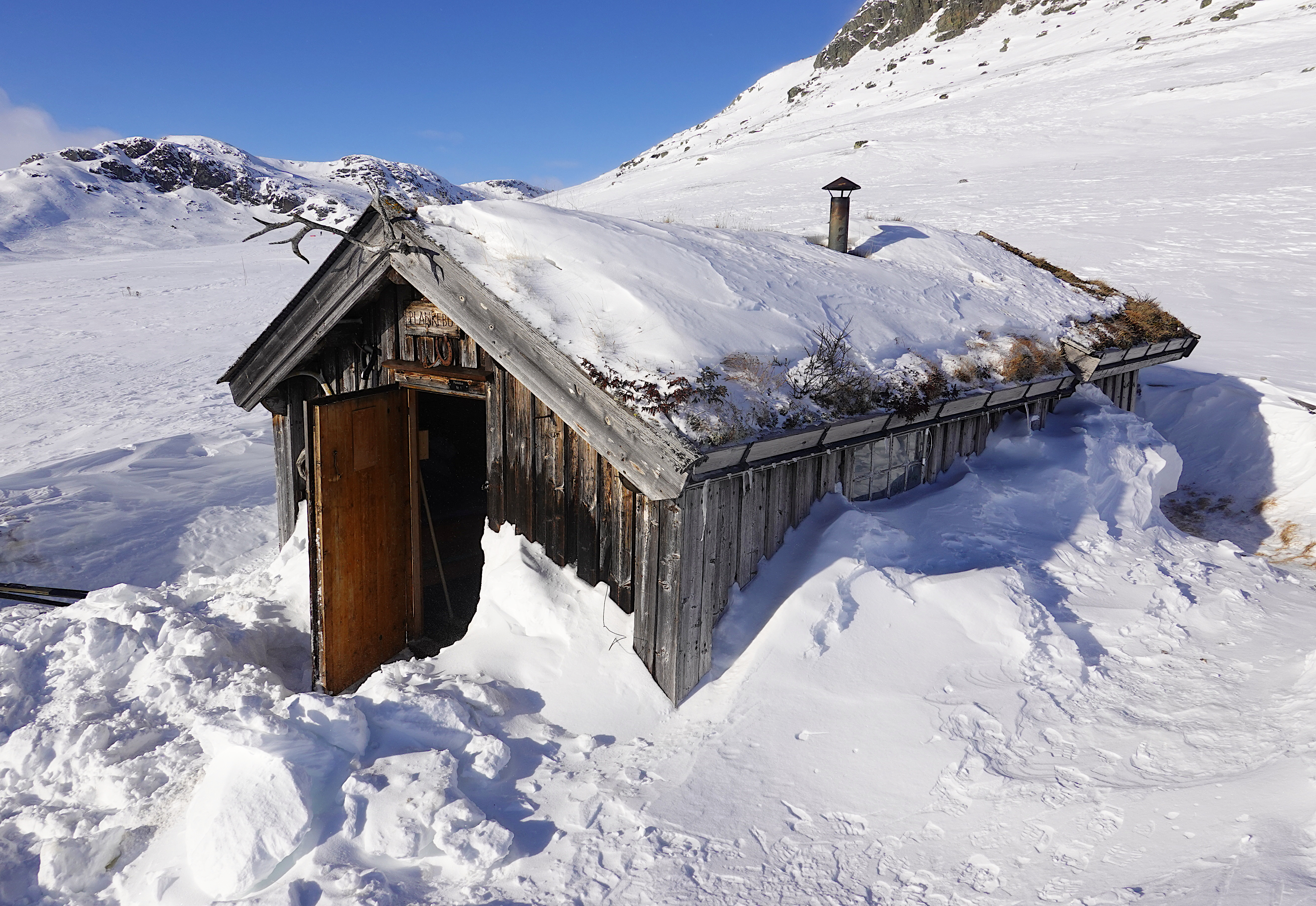
Plankebue shelter, Langsua National Park, Norway
