= Kapp Linné Bird Sanctuary =

Protected area in Svalbard, Norway

Coordinates: 78°03′20″N 13°36′18″E

Kapp Linné Bird Sanctuary (Norwegian: Kapp Linné fuglereservat) is a bird reserve at Svalbard, Norway, established in 1973. It includes areas between Randvika and Fyrsjøen on Nordenskiöld Land. The protected area covers a total area of around 1,900,000 square metres.
