= Skorpa (Hol) =

Mountain in Norway

Highest point
- Coordinates: 60°46′45″N 7°51′11″E

Geography
- Location: Buskerud, Norway

Skorpa is a mountain in Hol in Buskerud, Norway.
