= Olsholmen Bird Sanctuary =

Protected area in Svalbard, Norway

Coordinates: 77°14′14″N 14°15′02″E

Olsholmen Bird Sanctuary (Norwegian: Olsholmen fuglereservat) is a bird reserve at Svalbard, Norway, established in 1973. It includes Olsholmen off Wedel Jarlsberg Land, Spitsbergen. The protected area covers a total area of around 461,000 square metres.
