= Setesdal Vesthei Ryfylkeheiane =

Protected area in Norway

Coordinates: 59°10′26″N 7°20′32″E

Setesdal Vesthei- Ryfylkeheiane
- IUCN category IV (habitat/species management area)
- Interactive map of Setesdal Vesthei- Ryfylkeheiane
- Location: Aust-Agder, Vest-Agder, Rogaland, Norway
- Nearest city: Kristiansand, Stavanger,
- Area: 2 448 km^{2}
- Established: 2000

Setesdal Vesthei Ryfylkeheiane is a protected area in Norway.
