= Forlandet National Park =

National park in Svalbard, Norway

- IUCN category II (national park)

- Interactive map of Forlandet National Park
- Location: Prins Karls Forland, Svalbard, Norway
- Coordinates: 78°33′N 11°7′E
- Area: 4,647 km^{2} (1,794 sq mi)
- Established: 1973
- Governing body: Directorate for Nature Management

Ramsar Wetland
- Official name: Forlandsøyane
- Designated: 24 July 1985
- Reference no.: 313

Forlandet National Park lies on the Norwegian archipelago of Svalbard. The park was created by a royal resolution on 1 June 1973 and covers the entire island of Prins Karls Forland and well as the sea around it. The Norwegian national park has an area of 616 km^{2} and a marine area of 4031 km^{2}.

This area is recognized for the world's most northerly range of seals and also the world's most northerly population of common guillemot. In the region there are numerous archeological remains from Norwegian and Russian hunters and whalers.

Forlandsøyane Bird Sanctuary inside the park has been recognised as a wetland of international importance by designation under the Ramsar Convention. The national park has also been identified as an Important Bird Area (IBA) by BirdLife International because it supports breeding populations of barnacle geese, common eiders and black guillemots.

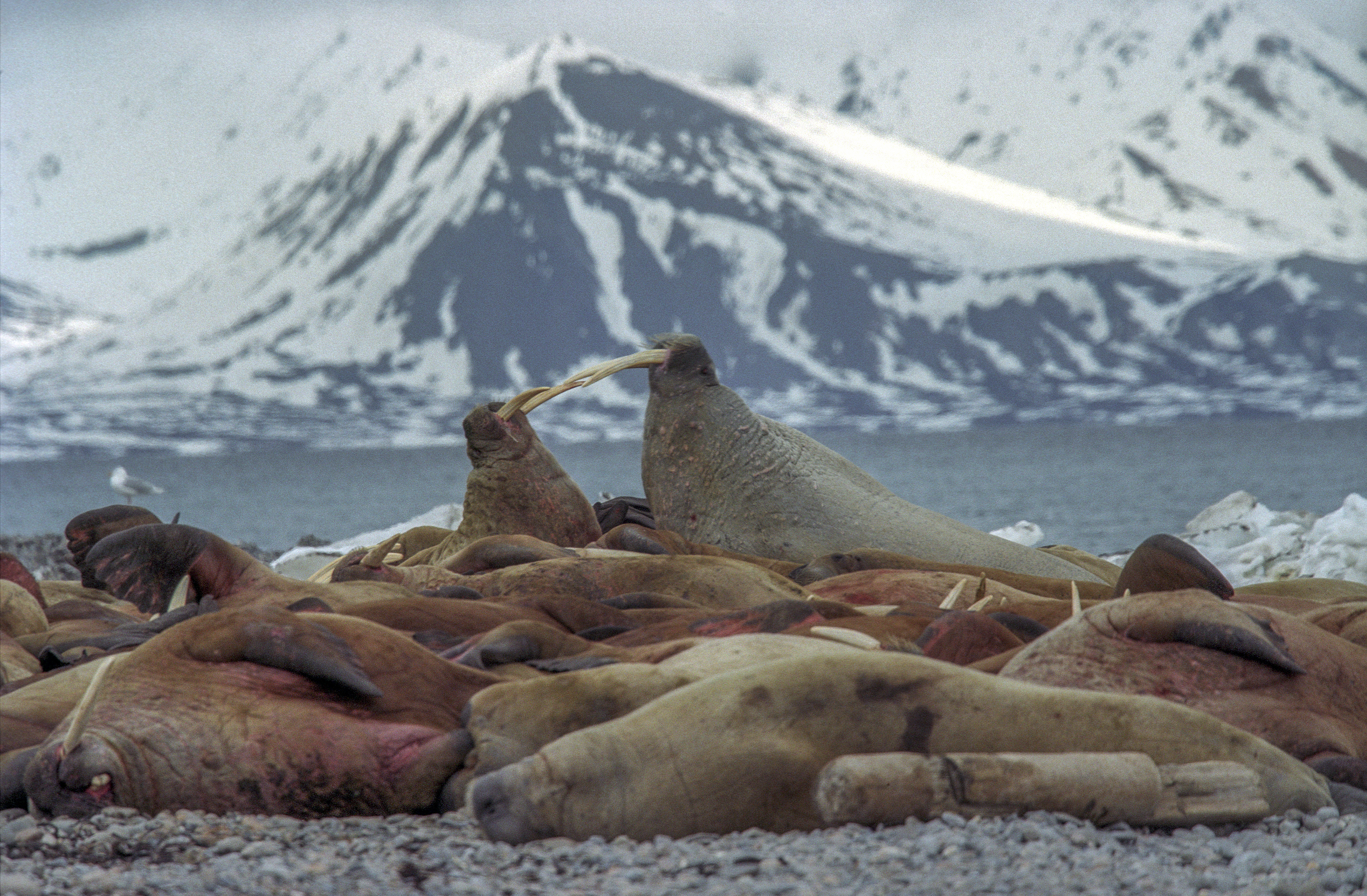
Walrus colony on Prins Karl Forland, photographed in 2003
