= Sassen–Bünsow Land National Park =

National park in Norway

Sassen – Bünsow Land National Park
- IUCN category II (national park)

- Interactive map of Sassen – Bünsow Land National Park
- Location: Spitsbergen, Svalbard, Norway
- Nearest city: Longyearbyen
- Coordinates: 78°23′N 17°15′E
- Area: 1,230 km^{2} (470 sq mi)
- Established: 2003
- Governing body: Directorate for Nature Management

Sassen–Bünsow Land National Park (Norwegian: Sassen–Bünsow Land nasjonalpark) lies on Spitsbergen island in the Svalbard archipelago, Norway. The park was opened in 2003 and includes both glaciers and several glacially carved valleys. The sealer/whaler Hilmar Nøis built the hunting station Fredheim on the north side of the Sassen river outlet in this area. One of Spitsbergen's highest waterfalls lies in Eskerdalen (Esker Valley) inside the park.

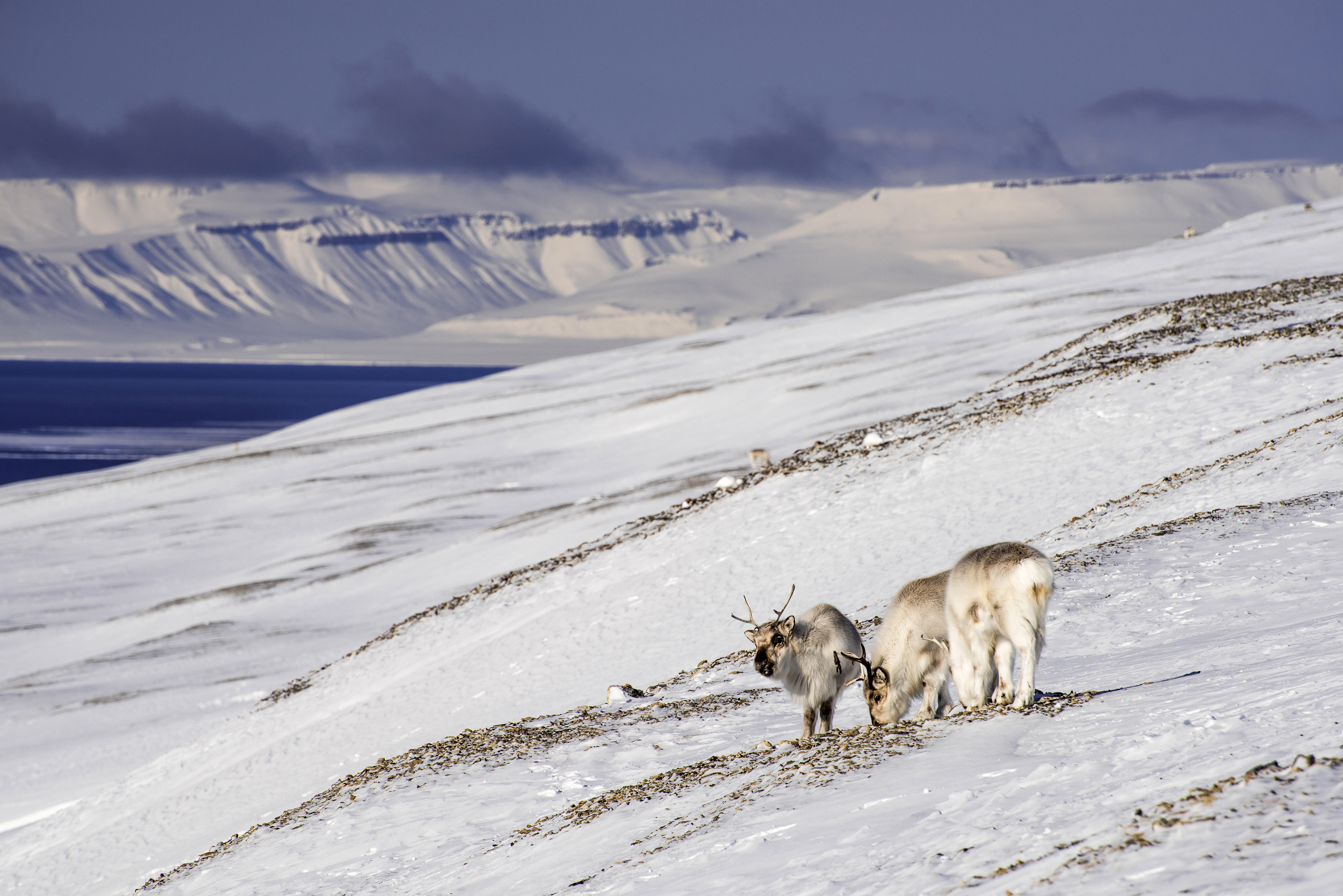
Reindeer in the park
