= Nordvest-Spitsbergen National Park =

National park in Norway

- IUCN category II (national park)

- Interactive map of Nordvest-Spitsbergen National Park
- Location: Svalbard, Norway
- Coordinates: 79°35′N 11°30′E
- Area: 9,914 km^{2} (3,828 sq mi)
- Established: 1973
- Governing body: Directorate for Nature Management

Nordvest-Spitsbergen National Park (Norwegian: Nordvest-Spitsbergen nasjonalpark) is located on the Norwegian arctic archipelago of Svalbard and includes parts of north-west Spitsbergen (Albert I Land and Haakon VII Land) and nearby islands such as Danes Island and Moffen. It contains, among other things, warm springs and remains of volcanoes in Bockfjorden.

== History ==
There are remains of whaling stations and graves from the 17th century. In addition there are remains of several Arctic expeditions, for instance in Virgohamna, Danes Island, the launching point for Swedish engineer S. A. Andrée's failed 1897 attempt to reach the North Pole in a hydrogen balloon. The park was established by royal resolution on 1 June 1973.

== Fauna ==
The park contains numerous colonies of seabirds, in addition to Svalbard reindeer and Arctic fox. It is also a hibernating area for polar bears, and walrus can be found there. About a third of the area, consisting mainly of its sea-cliffs, islands and other coastal features, has been identified as an Important Bird Area (IBA) by BirdLife International because it supports breeding populations of barnacle and brent geese, common eiders and black guillemots.

== Hot springs ==
The Troll and Jotun hot springs in the park along the edge of the Bockfjorden are the northernmost documented terrestrial hot springs on earth at almost 80 degrees north latitude. The first documentation of these springs was in the late 1800s. Hoel and Holtedahl studied these two hot springs in some detail. They reported that the Jotun hot spring has a temperature of 24.5°C and the Troll hot spring has a temperature of 28.3°C.
