= Skorpa Bird Sanctuary =

Bird sanctuary in Svalbard, Norway

Coordinates: 79°39′05″N 10°42′07″E

Skorpa Bird Sanctuary (Norwegian: Skorpa fuglereservat) is a bird reserve at Svalbard, Norway, established in 1973. It includes islets off Harpunodden (a southwest point of Danes Island) in Albert I Land, Spitsbergen. The protected area covers a total area of around 1,100,000 square metres.
