= Forlandsøyane Bird Sanctuary =

Protected area in Norway

Coordinates: 78°20′23″N 11°34′38″E

Forlandsøyane Bird Sanctuary (Norwegian: Forlandsøyane fuglereservat) is a bird reserve at Svalbard, Norway, established in 1973. It includes Forlandsøyane off Prins Karls Forland. The protected area covers a total area of around 5,400,000 square metres.
