= Dunøyane Bird Sanctuary =

Protected area in Svalbard, Norway

Dunøyane Bird Sanctuary (Norwegian: Dunøyane fuglereservat) is a bird reserve in Svalbard, Norway, established in 1973. It includes islands west of Dunøysundet in Wedel Jarlsberg Land. The protected area covers a total of around 11.9 km^{2}.

The island group of Dunøyane is a nesting site for barnacle goose, common eider and Arctic tern.
