= Guissezholmen Bird Sanctuary =

Protected area in Svalbard, Norway

Coordinates: 79.064°N 11.634°E

Guissezholmen Bird Sanctuary (Norwegian: Guissezholmen fuglereservat) is a bird reserve at Svalbard, Norway, established in 1973. It includes islets at Kapp Guissez in Haakon VII Land. The protected area covers a total area of around 400,000 square metres.
