= Moseøya Bird Sanctuary =

Protected area in Svalbard, Norway

Coordinates: 79°38′29″N 10°54′14″E

Moseøya Bird Sanctuary (Norwegian: Moseøya fuglereservat) is a bird reserve at Svalbard, Norway, established in 1973. It includes Moseøya, south of Danes Island, part of Albert I Land. The protected area covers a total area of around 1,400,000 square metres.
