= Moffen =

Island on the coast of Spitsbergen

Coordinates: 80°00′N 14°30′E

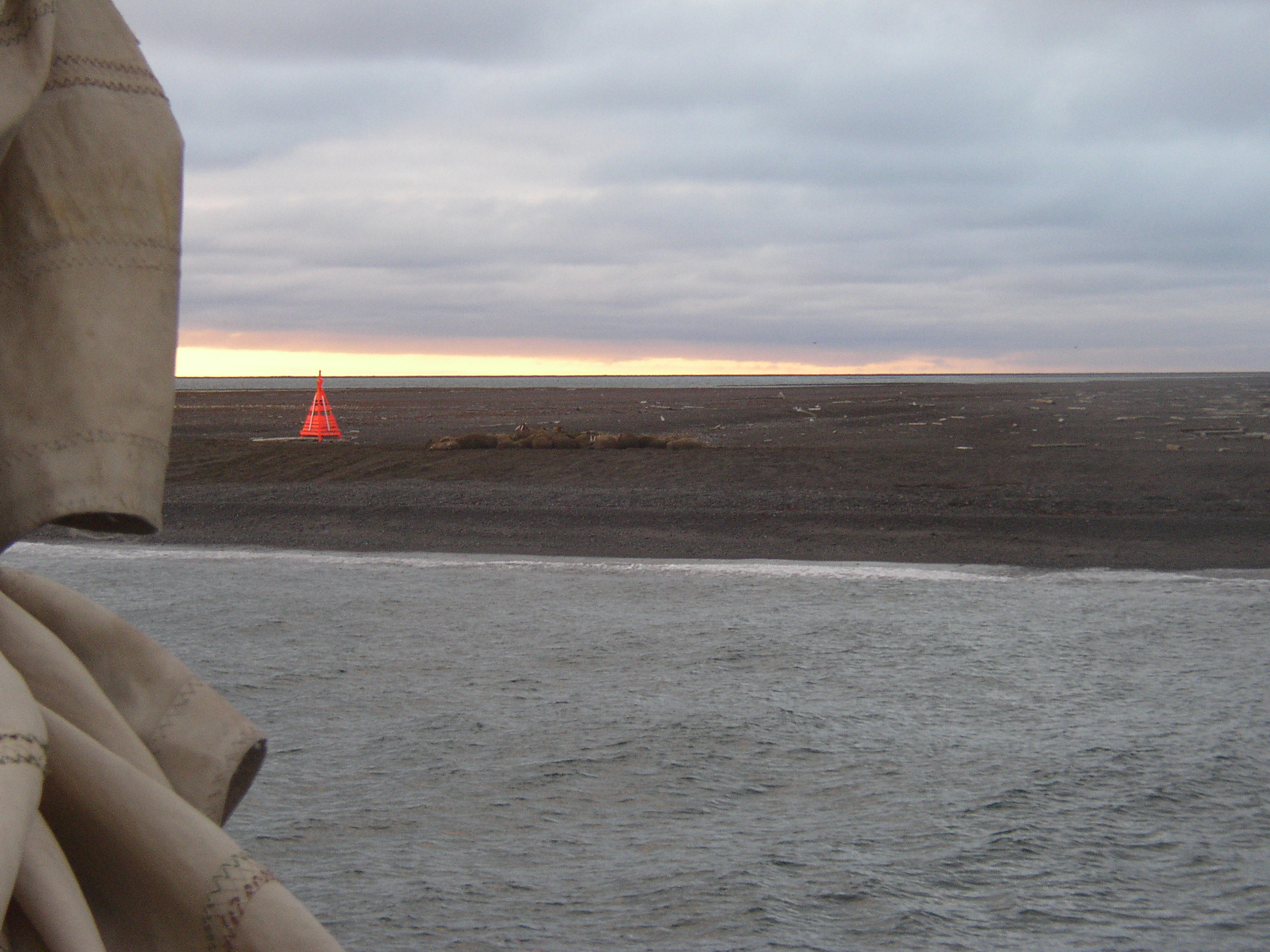
Moffen, 2005.

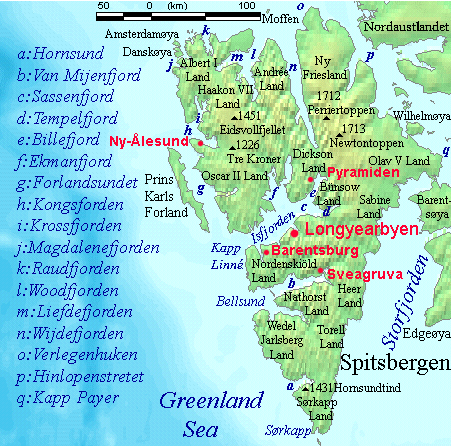
Moffen, clearly labelled on this map, is on the northern coast of Spitsbergen.

Chart of Moffen.

Moffen is a small, low island north of the mouth of Wijdefjorden, on the northern coast of Spitsbergen, the largest island of the Svalbard archipelago. The island lies just north of 80° so has become a popular target for vessels touring the archipelago but landing or entering the inner waters is strictly forbidden for fear of disturbing the wildlife as the island is an important haul-out area for Walrus and a nesting site for birds. The island was first labelled on a map by Hendrick Doncker, of Amsterdam, in 1655.
