= Sør-Spitsbergen National Park =

National park in Norway

- IUCN category II (national park)

- Interactive map of Sør-Spitsbergen National Park
- Location: Spitsbergen, Svalbard, Norway
- Coordinates: 77°9′N 16°17′E
- Area: 8,504 km^{2} (3,283 sq mi)
- Established: 1973
- Governing body: Directorate for Nature Management

Ramsar Wetland
- Official name: Isøyane
- Designated: 24 July 1985
- Reference no.: 316

Sør-Spitsbergen National Park (Norwegian: Sør-Spitsbergen nasjonalpark, English: South Spitzbergen National Park) encompasses the southern end of Spitsbergen island in the Svalbard archipelago, Norway. The park was opened in 1973 and includes Wedel Jarlsberg Land, Torell Land and Sørkapp Land. Over 65% of the region is ice cap, with much of the rest tundra.

== Important Bird Area ==
The park contains bird sanctuaries which protect islands with grassy vegetation, freshwater ponds and areas of bare rock. One of these is the Isøyane Bird Sanctuary which has also recognised as a wetland of international importance by designation under the Ramsar Convention. The park has been identified as an Important Bird Area (IBA) by BirdLife International because it supports breeding populations of barnacle geese (850–950 pairs), common eiders (1000 pairs), black-legged kittiwakes (25,900 pairs) and thick-billed guillemots (over 200,000 pairs).
