= Isøyane Bird Sanctuary =

Protected area in Svalbard, Norway

Coordinates: 77°08′34″N 14°47′47″E

Isøyane Bird Sanctuary (Norwegian: Isøyane fuglereservat) is a bird reserve at Svalbard, Norway, established in 1973. It includes Nordre Isøya and Isøykalven in the Isøyane island group in Wedel Jarlsberg Land. The protected area covers a total area of around 2,300,000 square metres.
