= Prins Karls Forland =

Island of Svalbard

Prins Karl Forland
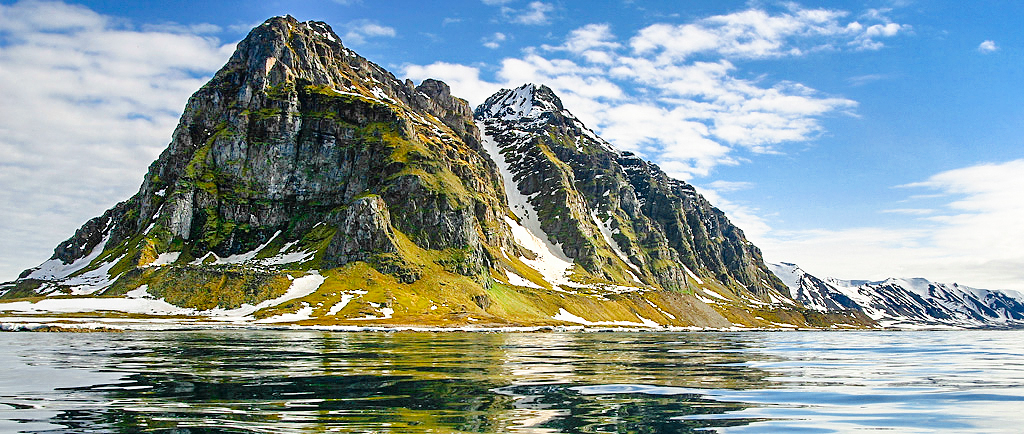
- Northern tip of the island
- Interactive map of Prins Karl Forland

Geography
- Location: Arctic Ocean
- Coordinates: 78°34′13″N 11°7′25″E
- Archipelago: Svalbard
- Area: 615 km^{2} (237 sq mi)
- Highest elevation: 1,084 m (3556 ft)
- Highest point: Monacofjellet

Administration
- Norway

Demographics
- Population: 0

Prins Karls Forland or Forlandet, occasionally anglicized as Prince Charles Foreland, is an island off the west coast of Oscar II Land on Spitsbergen in the Arctic archipelago of Svalbard, Norway. The entire island and the surrounding sea area constitutes Forlandet National Park (Forlandet nasjonalpark).

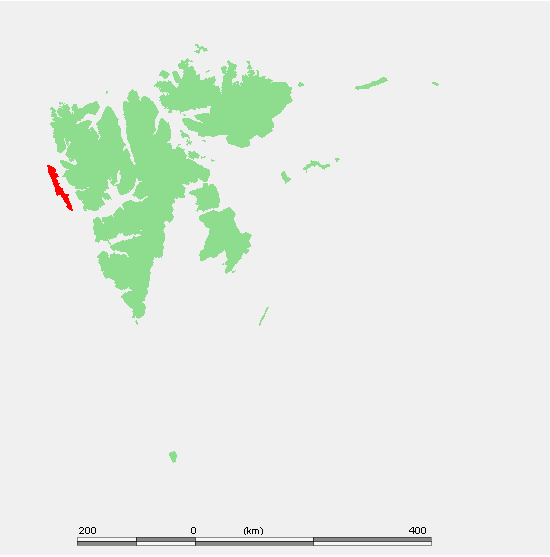
Prins Karls Forland in Svalbard

== History ==
The island was first seen by the Dutch explorer Willem Barentsz in 1596. In 1610, the English explorer Jonas Poole named it Black Point Isle. By 1612 the English whalers were referring to the island as Prince Charles' Foreland, after King James's son, Charles (later king of England and Scotland). The Dutch called it Kijn Island, after a merchant, who, climbing a tall hill in 1612, fell and broke his neck. The English built a temporary whaling station on the island's northern tip, known to them as Fair Foreland (today Fuglehuken).

== See also ==
- List of islands of Norway
