= Fairhaven (Svalbard) =

Area of Svalbard, Norway

Coordinates: 79°42′00″N 11°06′00″E

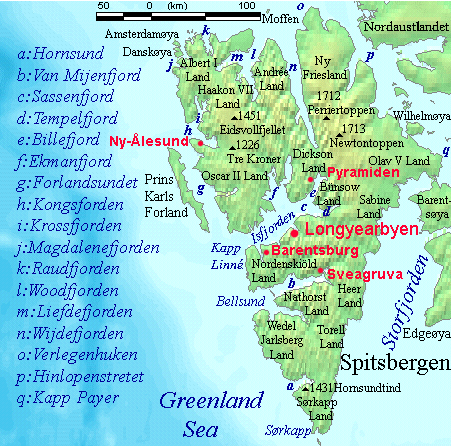
Fairhaven is the sound on the northwest coast, between Amsterdam Island and Danes Island.

Fairhaven is an area of Norway. Generally speaking, it is the area between Amsterdam Island and Danes Island and the mainland, while specifically it refers to the sound between Danes Island and the mainland (Albert I Land), in particular the strait between Moseøya and Danes Island. The modern name for this area is Smeerenburgfjorden (a modern blunder, as Smeerenburg was only a settlement).

The fjord is 20 kilometres (12.4 mi; 10.8 nmi) long and 4 kilometres (2.5 mi; 2.2 nmi) wide.

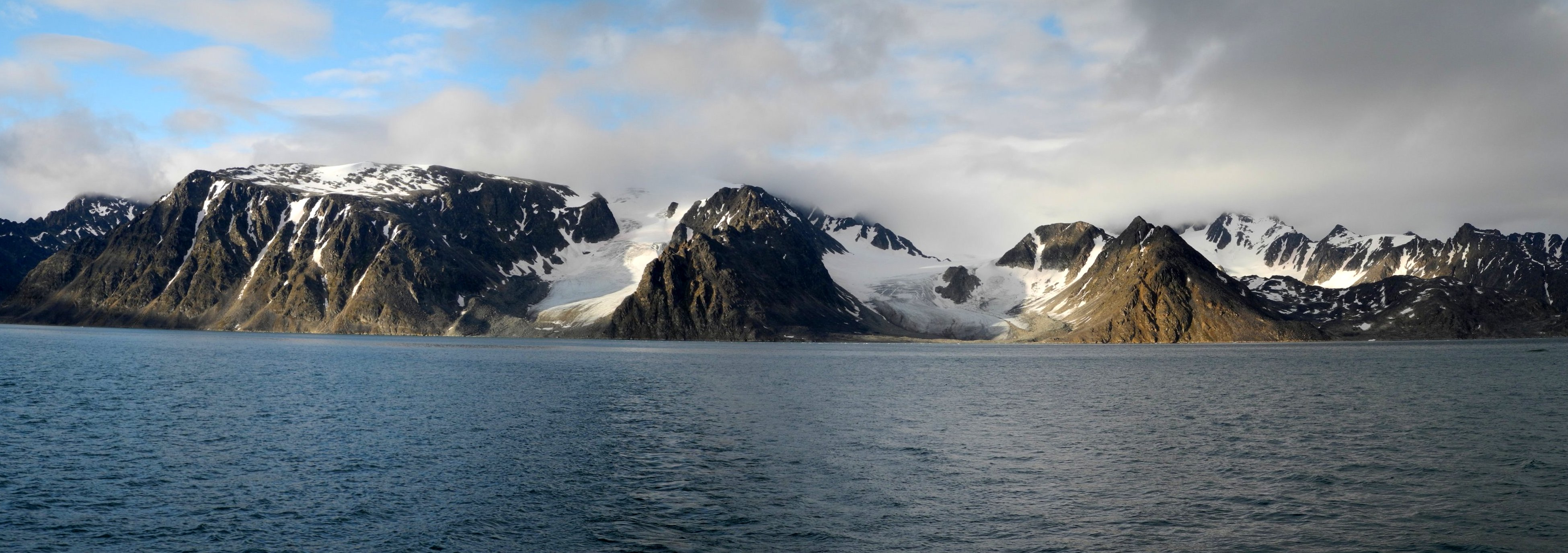

== History ==
Willem Barentsz was the first to explore the area around Fairhaven in 1596. The first indisputable visit by the English was made by Jonas Poole in the Amity in 1610. Thomas Marmaduke is known to have explored the area north of Fairhaven in 1612, and may have explored Fairhaven itself as well. Again, the following season (1613), Marmaduke explored as far north as Fairhaven. The first known whaling here occurred in 1614, with the Dutch resorting to Amsterdam Island and the English to the south. Here they both establish temporary whaling stations, the former most likely on the southeastern spit of Amsterdam Island, and the latter probably on the southeastern corner of Danes Island. In 1615, they again made their way to their respective anchorages in Fairhaven. In 1619 and 1620 there were also at least two Danish ships sharing the southern area with the English. The English continued to send ships to Fairhaven until 1624 or 1625, when the Dutch took over the area.

In 1619 the Dutch replaced the tents and temporary tryworks on Amsterdam Island with permanent structures of wood and brick, in what would become known as Smeerenburg, or "Blubbertown." At first only the men of Amsterdam and the Danes established themselves on the island, with the former claiming the east and the latter the west. By 1623 several chambers of the Noordsche Compagnie had erected structures for the processing and warehousing of whale oil, and by 1633 all the chambers were represented. Up to 200 men worked ashore during the peak years in the mid-1630s. The settlement began to decline in the early 1640s, and was probably abandoned in the following decade.

In 1636, another station, called the "Cookery of Harlingen", was established by the Dutch in Houcker Bay (Virgohamna) on the north side of Danes Island. The remains of this station were seen by Frederich Martens in 1671. In 1888/1889 Arnold Pike wintered in a hut he built on almost the exact site of the former station. In 1896 Herr Andrée established himself here in an attempt to reach the North Pole by balloon, but was forced to return to Sweden. He returned to Houcker Bay the following summer (1897), and accompanied by two others, left Houcker Bay on July 11 in the balloon Eagle. They were never heard of again. Parties from Andrée's ship, the Virgo, surveyed Fairhaven and the surrounding area.

== Cartography ==
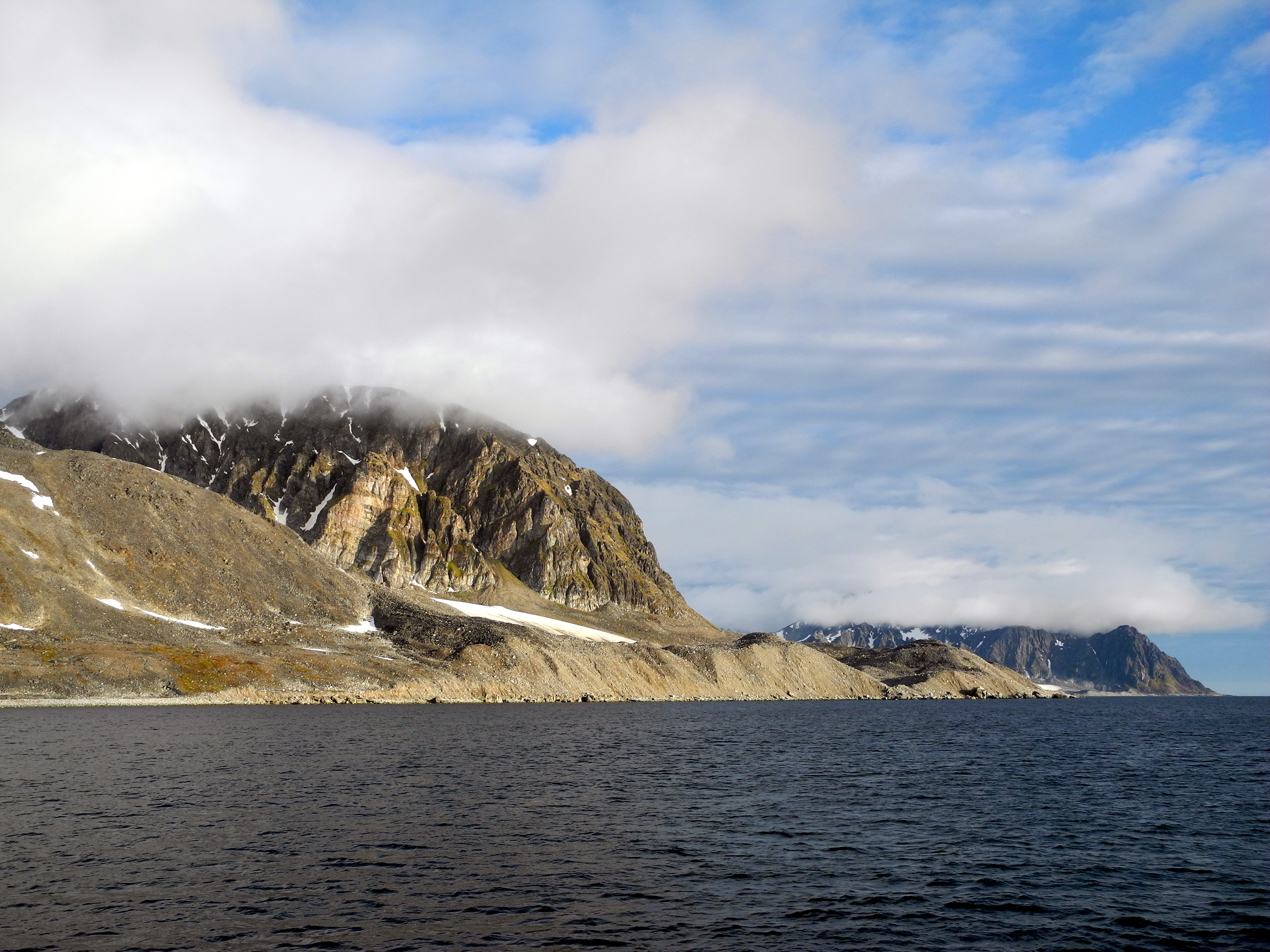
Sørgattet, the southwestern entrance to Fairhaven. The land is Reuschhalvøya, a peninsula of Albert I Land.

Fairhaven was named by Poole in 1610. The name is marked on the maps of Daniel (1612), Carolus (1614), Goos (1620), Guerard (1628), Vrolicq (1634), Carolus (1634), Colom (1648), and others. The Dutch called it Dutch Bay or Mauritius Bay, while Carolus (1614) marked it Hollandsche Bay. Although Mauritius Bay appears not to have been marked until Doncker's local map (1655), it was written of frequently and early on in Dutch official documents. As previously mentioned, Smeerenburgfjorden is a modern blunder.

Fairhaven was further divided north and south. The Englishman Robert Fotherby (1614) simply split the area into a "north harbor," where the Dutch established themselves, and a "south harbor," where the English were. The Dutch referred to the area northeast of Smeerenburg between the mainland and the island as North gat or North Bay, while they called the area where the English were English Bay or English harbor. The southwestern entrance to Fairhaven, between Danes Island and the mainland south of it, was first designated South gat by Doncker (1655), which is where the modern name, Sørgattet, comes from.

Amsterdam Island was first landed on by Barents in 1596. He named the island and the group of islands around it Gebroocken Land. It was probably first named Amsterdam Island in or after 1614, when the Dutch whalers first resorted to the island. The sound south of Amsterdam Island, between it and Danes Island, was variously named South bay, West bay, or Middel gat by the Dutch. It incorrectly became known as Danes gat by modern writers, and is now designated as Danskegattet. Martin Conway believes that the correct historical name is Middel gat.

Danes Island is first marked on Doncker's map (1655). It is named after the Danish whalers who resorted there. On the island's west coast, in Robbe Bay (Kobbefjorden), they established a permanent station in 1631, which they occupied until 1658. Robbe Bay is first marked on Dutch maps from Middelhoven's (1634) to that of Giles and Rep (c. 1710). The latter mapmakers were the first to call it Danes Bay, while the Danish themselves called it Copenhagen Bay. The English called the islands southwest point Gurnerd’s Nose, while the Dutch called it Engelsche Uytkyk, or English Outlook. The bay in the north coast was called by the Dutch Houcker Bay, but has been renamed Virgo Bay (Virgohamna) after Andrée's steamer. Off the northeastern coast lays a small island, which the Dutch called Deadman’s Island, which, as the name suggests, was used as a graveyard by the whalers. It is now known by its Norwegian equivalent, Likholmen (Corpse Island).

== Modern Fairhaven ==
South of Fuglesongen, Klovningen, and Ytre Norskøya modern charts wrongly mark Fairhaven. As mentioned in the introduction, the true Fairhaven is the area to the south between Amsterdam Island and Danes Island and the mainland.
