= Buchananhalvøya =

Norwegian peninsula

Coordinates: 79.6867°N 12.1669°E

Buchananhalvøya is a peninsula in Albert I Land at Spitsbergen, Svalbard. It is located at the head of Raudfjorden, where the fjord branches into Ayerfjorden to the west and Klinckowströmfjorden to the east of the peninsula. It is named after John Young Buchanan. The mountain Buchanantoppen is located at the southern part of the peninsula, with Chauveaubreen to the west and Raudfjordbreen at the eastern side.
