= Bjørnfjorden =

Fjord in Svalbard, Norway

Coordinates: 79.64°N 11.36°E

Bjørnfjorden (The Bear Fjord) is a fjord in Albert I Land at Spitsbergen, Svalbard. The fjord is located between Reuschhalvøya and Vasahalvøya, and is an inner branch of Smeerenburgfjorden. Smeerenburgbreen debouches into the fjord. At the south side of the fjord are Scheibukta and St. Laurentiusbukta.
