= Danskegattet =

Strait in Svalbard, Norway

Coordinates: 79°43′54″N 10°51′12″E

Danskegattet is a strait in Albert I Land at Spitsbergen, Svalbard. It is located between Danes Island to the south and Amsterdam Island to the north, leading into Smeerenburgfjorden. A common anchorage is west of Virgohamna.
