= Stortinden =

Mountain in Norway

Coordinates: 67°01′N 14°16′E

Stortinden is a mountain in Albert I Land at Spitsbergen, Svalbard. It has a height of 1010 m.a.s.l. and is the highest peak at the peninsula of Vasahalvøya. It is located between the fjord Ayerfjorden and the glacier Svitjodbreen.
