= Sørgattet =

Strait in Svalbard, Norway

Coordinates: 79.6520°N 10.9987°E

Sørgattet is a strait in Albert I Land at Spitsbergen, Svalbard. It runs between Reuschhalvøya and Danes Island, and forms the southern entrance to Smeerenburgfjorden. Moseøya in Sørgattet has a rich birdlife and is protected as a bird sanctuary.
