= Scheibreen =

Glacier in Svalbard, Norway

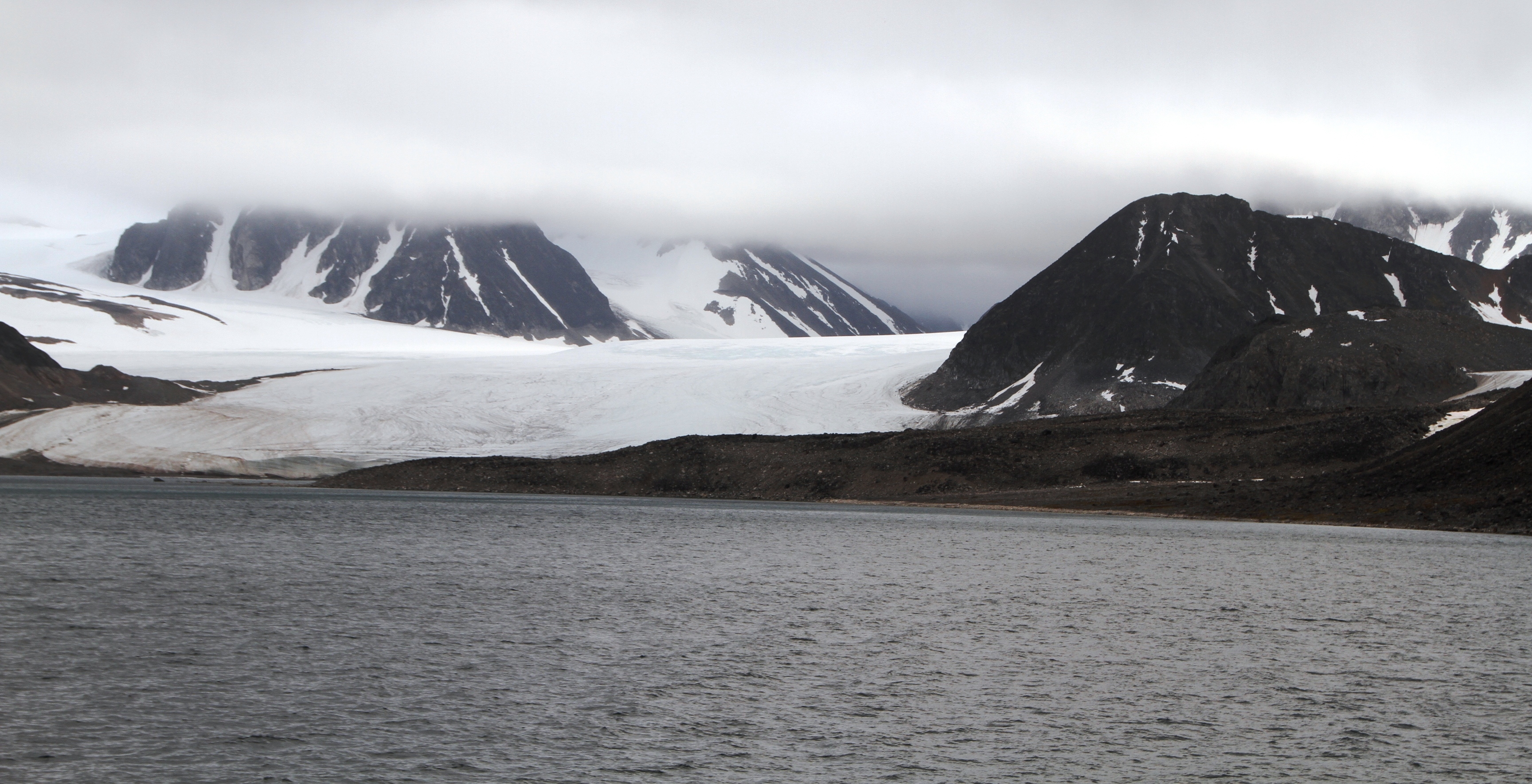
- View of Scheibreen

- Location within Svalbard
- Location: Albert I Land; Spitsbergen, Svalbard
- Coordinates: 79°36′01″N 11°12′45″E
- Terminus: Scheibukta, Smeerenburgfjorden

Scheibreen is a glacier in Albert I Land at Spitsbergen, Svalbard. It is located on Reuschhalvøya, and debouches into Scheibukta, a southern bay of Smeerenburgfjorden. The glacier is named after geologist Per Schei.

== See also ==
- List of glaciers in Svalbard
