= Ben Nevis (disambiguation) =

Ben Nevis, near Fort William in Scotland, is the highest mountain in the British Isles, standing at 1,345 m or 4,413 ft above sea level.

Ben Nevis may also refer to:

- Ben Nevis, a Scottish malt whisky produced by Ben Nevis Distillery
- Ben Nevis (horse), a racehorse that won the Grand National
- Ben Nevis (Svalbard), a mountain in Spitsbergen
- Ben Nevis Township, a township in Ontario, Canada

== See also ==
- Nevis (disambiguation)
