= Svitjodbreen =

Glacier in Svalbard, Norway

Coordinates: 79.7048°N 11.6379°E

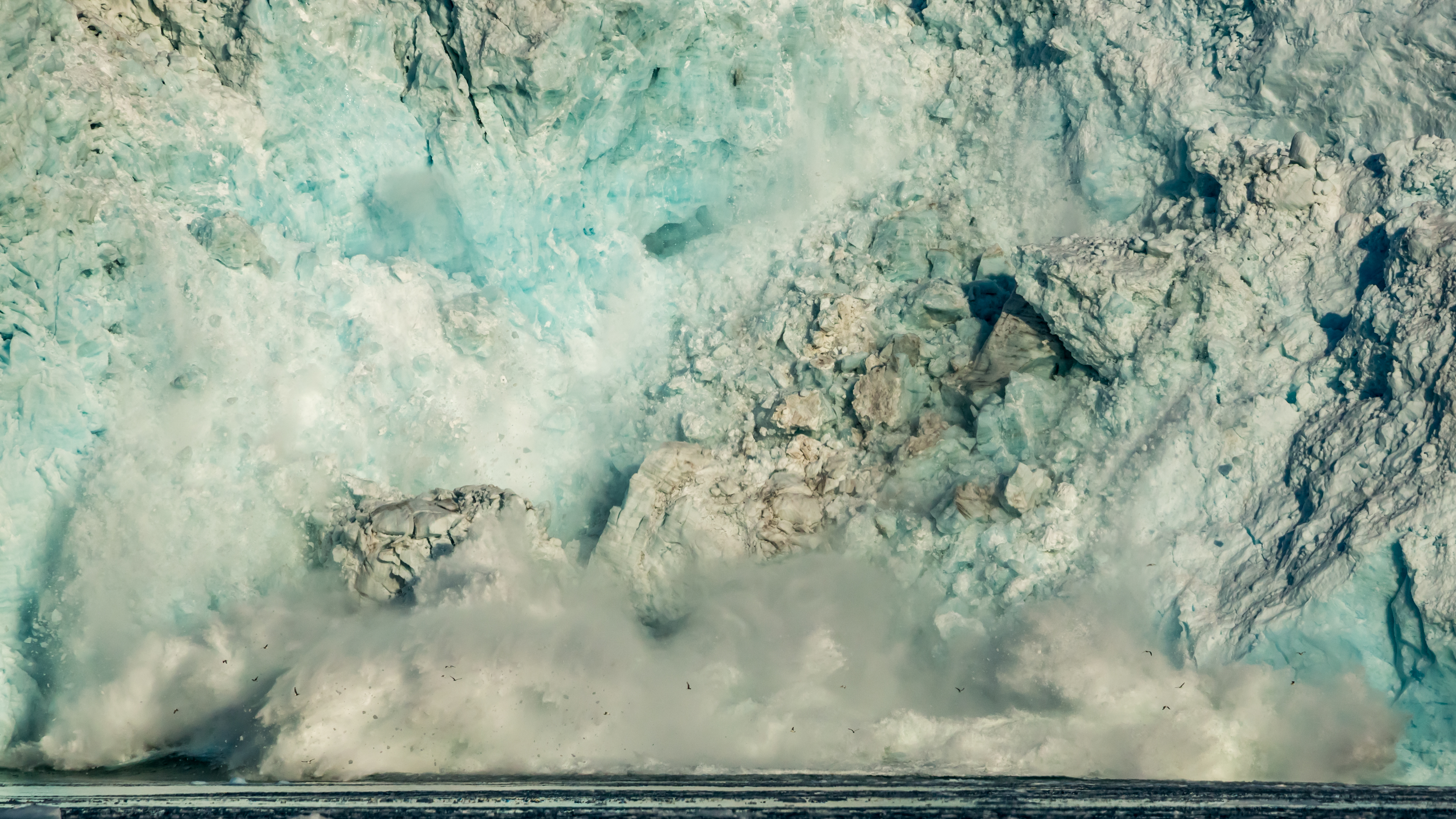
Svitjordbreen on Svalbard calving

Svitjodbreen is a glacier in Albert I Land at Spitsbergen, Svalbard. The glacier is located centrally on the peninsula of Vasahalvøya. It debouches northwards into the head of Fuglefjorden, and has also several offsprings in other directions.
