= Smeerenburgfjorden =

Fjord in Svalbard

Coordinates: 79.6643°N 11.1737°E

Smeerenburgfjorden is a fjord in Albert I Land at Spitsbergen, Svalbard. It has a length of about twenty kilometers and a width of about four kilometers. The fjord is named after the old whaling settlement Smeerenburg, which was situated at the southern part of Amsterdam Island. The fjord is located between the peninsulas of Vasahalvøya and Reuschhalvøya, and connects westwards through the straits of Danskegattet and Sørgattet. The Smeerenburgbreen glacier debouches into the head of the fjord.
