= Ytre Norskøya =

Island in Svalbard, Norway

Coordinates: 79°51′20″N 11°35′54″E

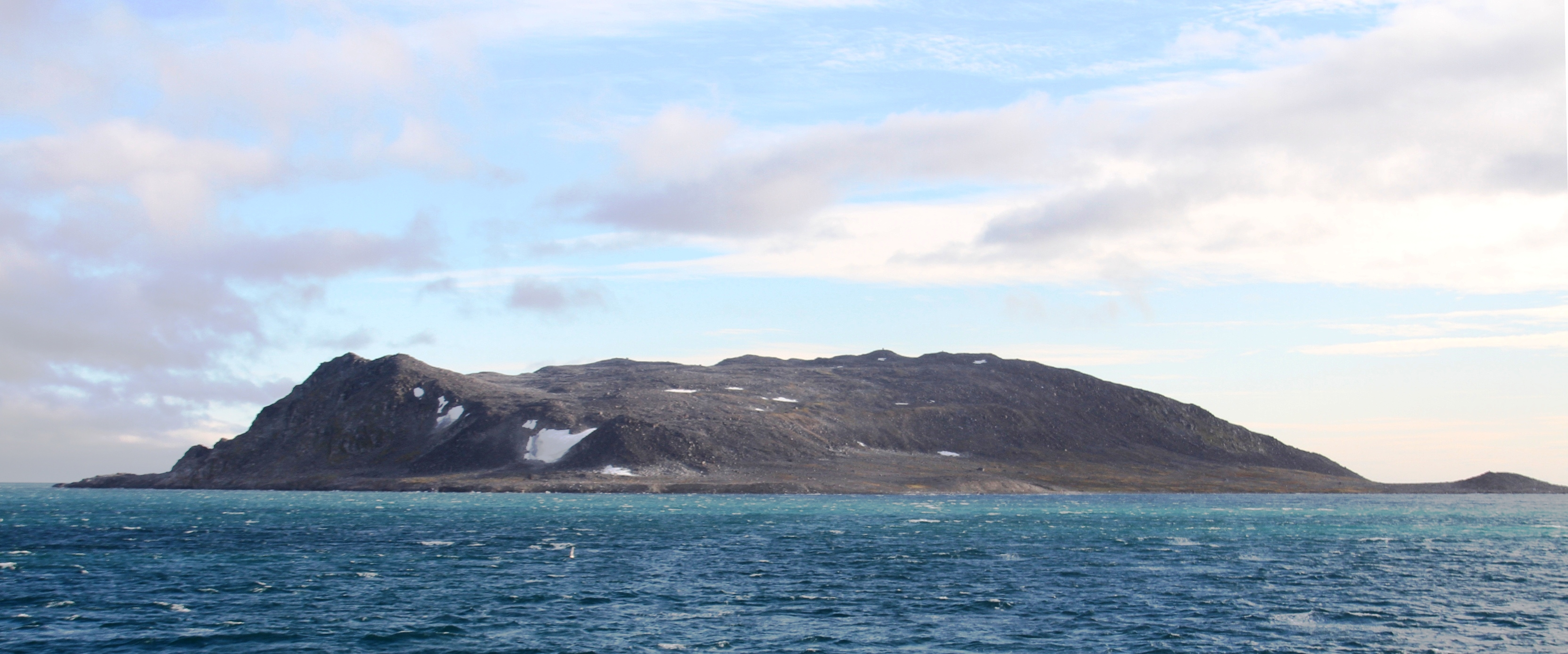

Ytre Norskøya (English: Outer Norway Island) is an island on the northwest coast of Spitsbergen, part of the Svalbard archipelago.

== History ==
Remains of a whaling station exist on the southern side of the island, possibly rivaling Smeerenburg in size. It was Europe's northernmost outpost ever established until the early 19th century; and the most northerly permanent settlement established of any size until the 1950s. The station had as many as nine tryworks, some having a single furnace, others having two. To the west of these structures were buildings used by the men working ashore. Further west is found one of the largest grave sites in Spitsbergen, where 165 graves have been found. The station probably belonged to the Zeeland partners of the Noordsche Compagnie, who were forced to settle on Ytre Norskøya sometime after 1619 because the whaling vessels belonging to Amsterdam would not allow them to establish themselves at Smeerenburg. A high look-out point on the island called Zeeusche Uytkyk (Zeeland Look-out) was used by the Dutch to search for the spouts of bowhead whales. The name appears on Henrik Doncker's 1655 map of Mauritius Bay (modern Smeerenburgfjorden), which, however, shows the bay as it was in the 1620s (when the Danes abandoned Smeerenburg). The station was abandoned in 1670.
