= Grampianfjella =

Mountain ridge in Svalbard, Norway

Coordinates: 78.6239°N 10.9408°E

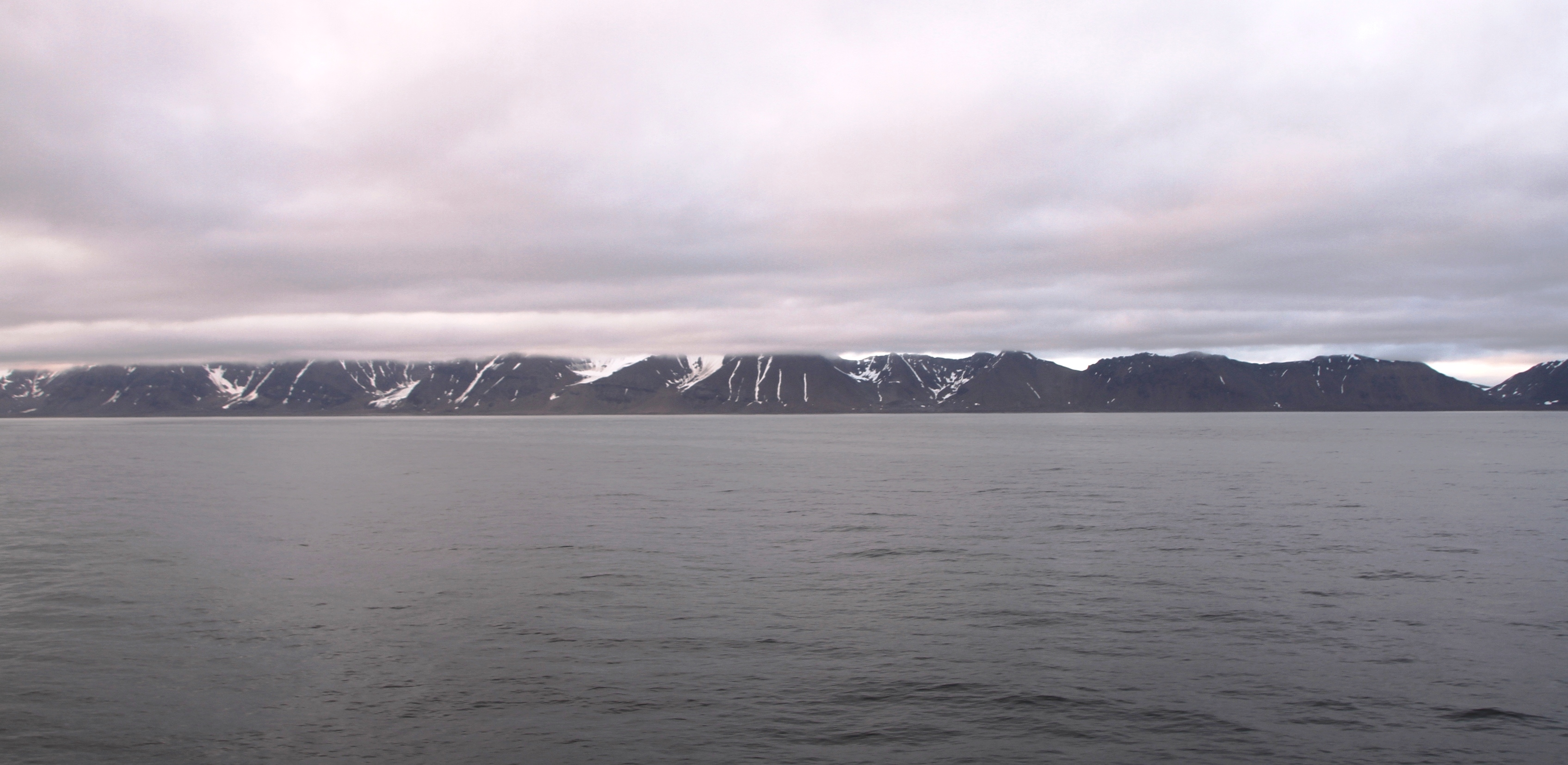
Grampianfjella as viewed from the west

Grampianfjella is a mountain ridge in Prins Karls Forland, Svalbard. The ridge is named after the Scottish Grampian Mountains. Among the mountains of the ridge are Monacofjellet, Jessiefjellet, Charlesfjellet, Parnasset, Phippsaksla, Nipenosa, Phippsfjellet, Djevletommelen, Klørne, Neglene and Kasinoet.
