= Kasinoet =

Mountain in Svalbard, Norway

Coordinates: 78.6517°N 10.9491°E

Kasinoet (The Casino) is a mountain on Prins Karls Forland, Svalbard. It has a height of 949 m.a.s.l. and is located on the ridge of Grampianfjella, between Phippsfjellet and Monacofjellet.
