= Smeerenburgbreen =

Glacier in Svalbard

Coordinates: 79.5808°N 11.6002°E

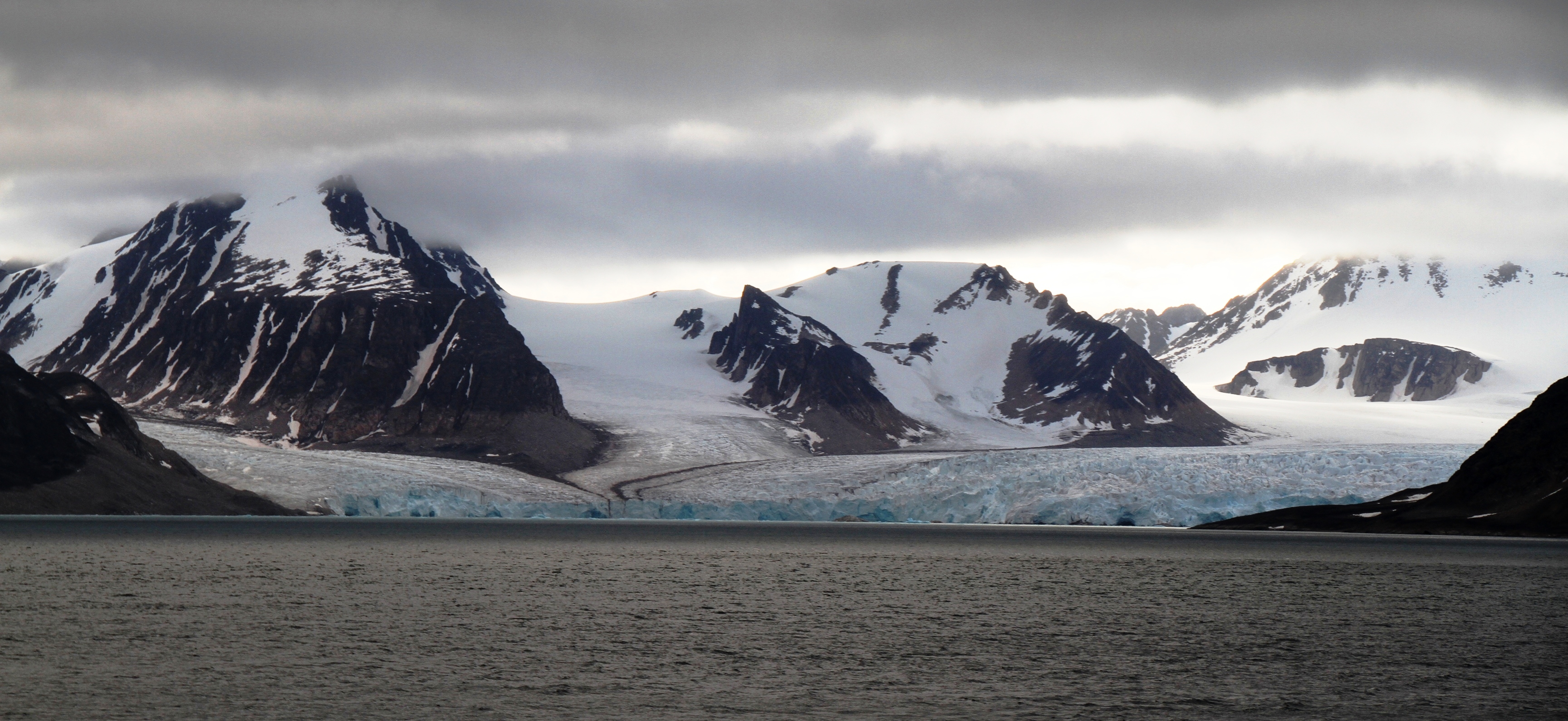
Smeerenburgbreen Björnfjorden from NW

Smeerenburgbreen is a glacier in Albert I Land at Spitsbergen, Svalbard. It is located east of Reuschhalvøya. The glacier debouches into Bjørnfjorden, the inner part of Smeerenburgfjorden. Smeerenburg was the name of a Dutch whaling station from the 17th century located on Amsterdam Island.
