= St. Laurentiusbukta =

Hydrological feature

Coordinates: 79.6313°N 11.2561°E

St. Laurentiusbukta is a bay in Albert I Land at Spitsbergen, Svalbard. The bay is located on Reuschhalvøya, east of Scheibukta, at the southern side of Bjørnfjorden. It is named after the saint Laurentius.
