= Van Dillen =

Van Dillen is a surname. Notable people with the surname include:

- Bob Van Dillen (born 1972), American meteorologist
- Erik van Dillen (born 1951), American tennis player
- Johannes Gerard van Dillen (1883–1969), Dutch economic historian
- Oscar van Dillen (born 1958), Dutch composer
