= Virgohamna =

Bay in Svalbard, Norway

Coordinates: 79°43′24″N 10°54′42″E

Virgohamna (English: Virgo Bay) is a small bay on the northern coast of Danes Island, an island off the northwestern coast of Spitsbergen. Spitsbergen and Danes Island are islands of the Svalbard archipelago. The bay is named after SS Virgo, the vessel of Swedish engineer and explorer Salomon August Andrée's 1896 expedition. Virgohamna is located across a small strait from Smeerenburg, a historical whaling station on Amsterdam Island about 2 km to the north.

== History ==
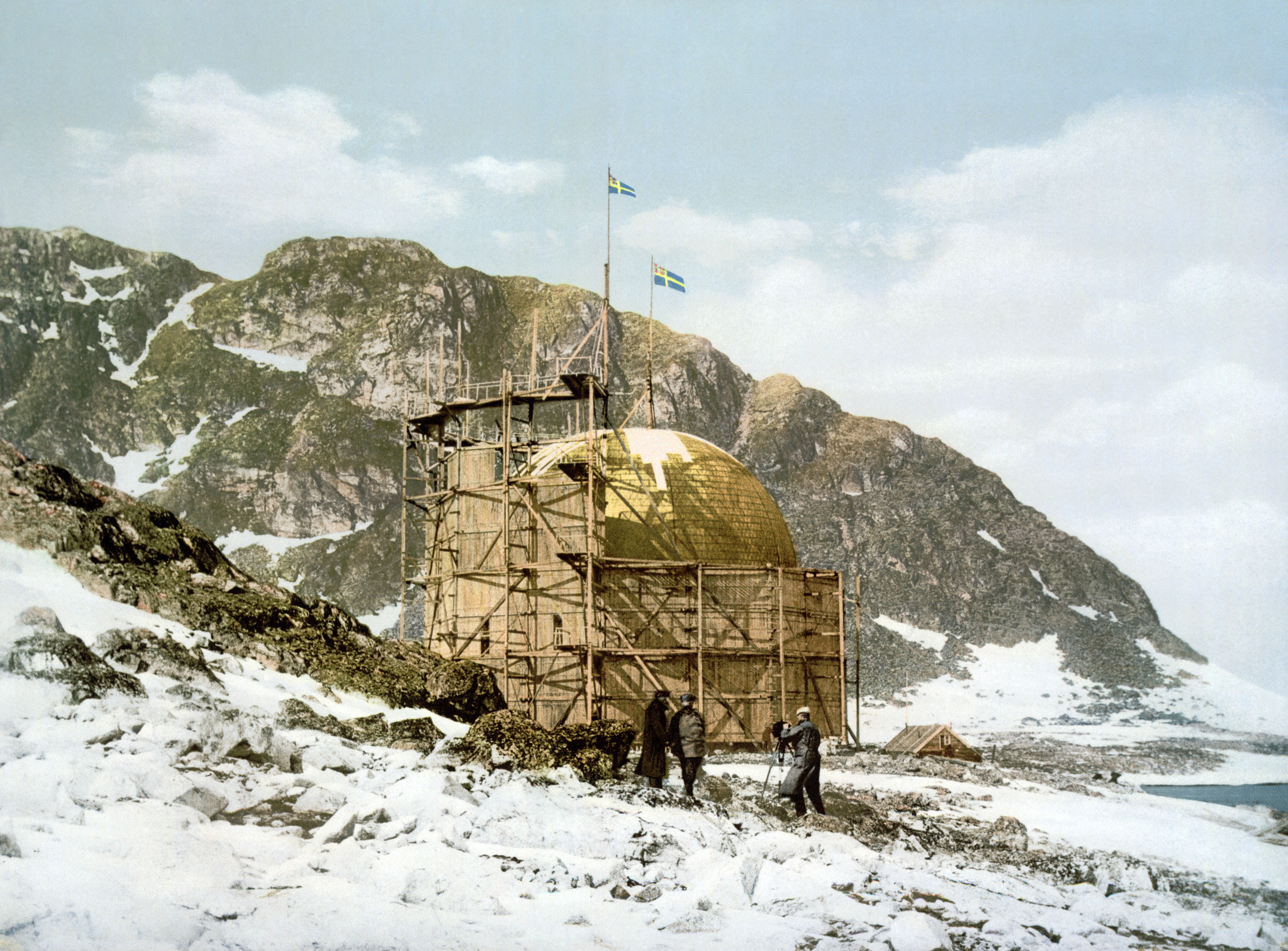
Andrée's station on the western shores of Virgohamna, from a photochrom print (c. 1896-97).

The Dutch were the first to use Virgohamna as a whaling base as early as 1633 (perhaps earlier). The Dutch overwinterers in 1633-34 referred to it as "Houcker Bay". In 1636, with no room being available along the beach at Smeerenburg, the newly added Friesland chamber of the Noordsche Compagnie established what was later called the Harlingen kokerij ("Cookery of Harlingen"). By 1662 the ships from Harlingen had found little use for the station, with the merchants of the original charter offering other Dutch whalers its use for a certain fee. The German surgeon Friderich Martens visited the (by then) abandoned station in 1671, where he found four buildings still standing, "whereof two were warehouses, in the others they dwelt". There he found tools and barrels frozen up in the ice. Archaeological excavations have found the remains of five buildings and two double-ovens belonging to the station. Another station was found on Æøya, a small island on the eastern side of the bay named after the common eiders that live there.

S.A. Andrée built a balloon hangar at Virgohamna in 1896, as part of his staging area for attempts to reach the North Pole by balloon. Adverse winds forced Andrée to return home on his first attempt. He returned to Virgohamna in the summer of 1897, and early in July made a fatal attempt to reach the pole.

In 1906, American Walter Wellman built an airship hangar and base camp in the bay for an attempt to reach the pole by airship. The hangar was not completed until August, too late for an attempt to reach the pole. Wellman returned the following summer, but again failed to reach the North Pole by airship. Wellman returned to Virgohamna in 1909, but again failed to reach the pole.
