= Djevletommelen =

Mountain in Svalbard, Norway

Coordinates: 78.6504°N 11.0240°E

Djevletommelen (Devil's Thumb) is a mountain in Prins Karls Forland, Svalbard. The mountain has a height of 831 m.a.s.l. and is located northeast of Phippsfjellet, and appears as a nunatak of the Buchananisen glacier.
