= Fugløya, Svalbard =

Island in Albert I Land, Spitsbergen

Coordinates: 79.8050°N 11.3456°E

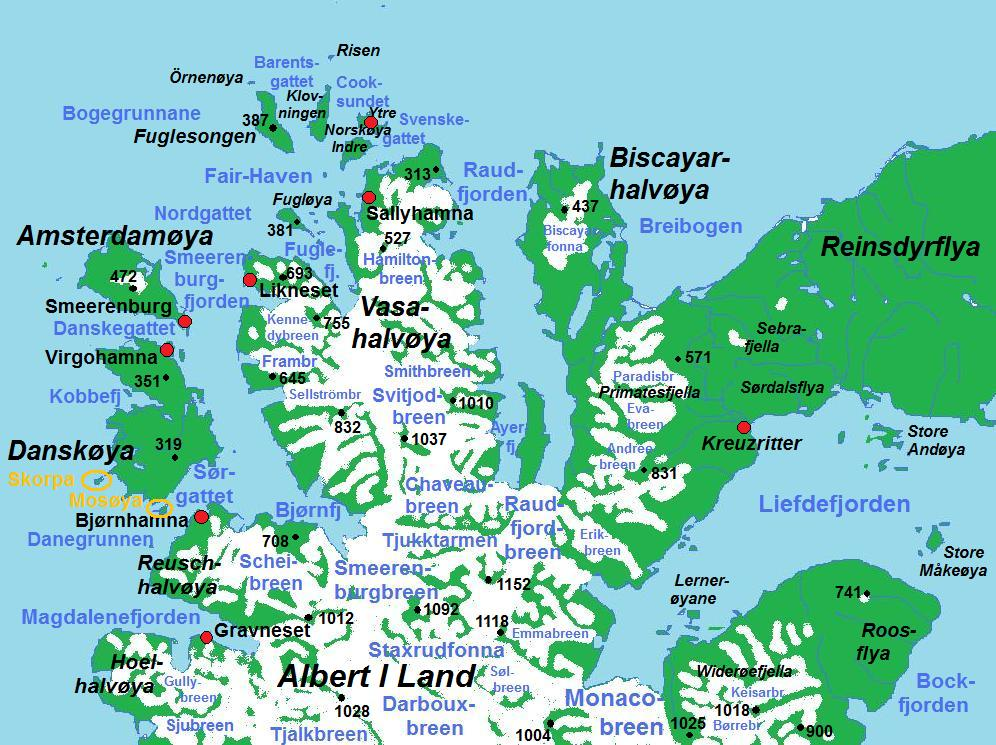
area map

Fugløya is an island in Albert I Land at Spitsbergen, Svalbard. It has a size of about 2.5 square kilometers, and is located off the peninsula Vasahalvøya, in the mouth of Fuglefjorden, and divides the fjord into two branches.
