= Hornemantoppen =

Mountain in Spitsbergen, Svalbard

Coordinates: 79.5731°N 11.7243°E

Hornemantoppen is a mountain in Albert I Land at Spitsbergen, Svalbard. The mountain has a height of 1,092 m.a.s.l. and is located between Hans Henrikbreen and Smeerenburgbreen. It is named after Norwegian geologist, and mining engineer Hans Henrik Horneman. Hornemantoppen is the highest mountain in Albert I Land.
