= Fugløya =

Fugløya (transl. Bird Island) may refer to:

== Places ==
- Fugløya, Austevoll, an island in Austevoll municipality in Hordaland county, Norway
- Fugløya, Flatanger, an island in Flatanger municipality in Trøndelag county, Norway
- Fugløya, Gildeskål, an island in Gildeskål municipality in Nordland county, Norway
- Fugløya, Iveland, an island in Iveland municipality in Aust-Agder county, Norway
- Fugløya, Kristiansund, an island in Kristiansund municipality in Møre og Romsdal county, Norway
- Fugløya, Larvik, an island in Larvik municipality in Vestfold county, Norway
- Fugløya, Lødingen, an island in Lødingen municipality in Nordland county, Norway
- Fugløya, Smøla, an island in Smøla municipality in Møre og Romsdal county, Norway
- Fugløya, Snillfjord, an island in Snillfjord municipality in Trøndelag county, Norway
- Fugløya, Svalbard, an island in Svalbard, Norway
- Fugløya, Tvedestrand, an island in Tvedestrand municipality in Aust-Agder county, Norway
- Nord-Fugløya, alternatively just Fugløya, island in Karløy municipality in Troms county, Norway

== See also ==
- Fugloy or Fuglø, an island in the Faroe Islands
