= Klinckowströmfjorden =

Fjord in Svalbard, Norway

Coordinates: 79.6934°N 12.2464°E

Klinckowströmfjorden is the eastern branch of Raudfjorden at Spitsbergen, Svalbard, on the divide between Albert I Land and Haakon VII Land. It is named after Swedish zoologist Axel Klinckowström. The glacier Raudfjordbreen debouches into the fjord. The peninsula Buchananhalvøya separates Klinckowströmfjorden from the western fjord branch Ayerfjorden. The mountain Ben Nevis is located southeast of the fjord.
