= Ben Nevis (Svalbard) =

Mountain in Spitsbergen, Norway

- Location within Svalbard

Highest point
- Elevation: 3,025 ft (922 m)
- Coordinates: 79.6474°N 12.4189°E

Geography
- Location: Albert I Land, Spitsbergen, Svalbard, Norway

Ben Nevis is a mountain in Albert I Land at Spitsbergen, Svalbard. It is located southeast of the head of the Raudfjorden branch Klinckowströmfjorden, and reaches a height of 922 metres (3,025 ft) above sea level. It is named after the Scottish mountain Ben Nevis.
