= Chauveaubreen =

Glacier in Svalbard, Norway

Coordinates: 79.6423°N 11.9805°E

Chauveaubreen is a glacier in Albert I Land at Spitsbergen, Svalbard. The glacier is located between Renaudfjellet and Marstranderfjellet, and debouches into Ayerfjorden, the western branch of Raudfjorden. It is named after French physician Henri Jean Charles Albert Chaveau.
