= Nordvestøyane =

Island in Svalbard, Norway

Coordinates: 79.8414°N 11.4596°E

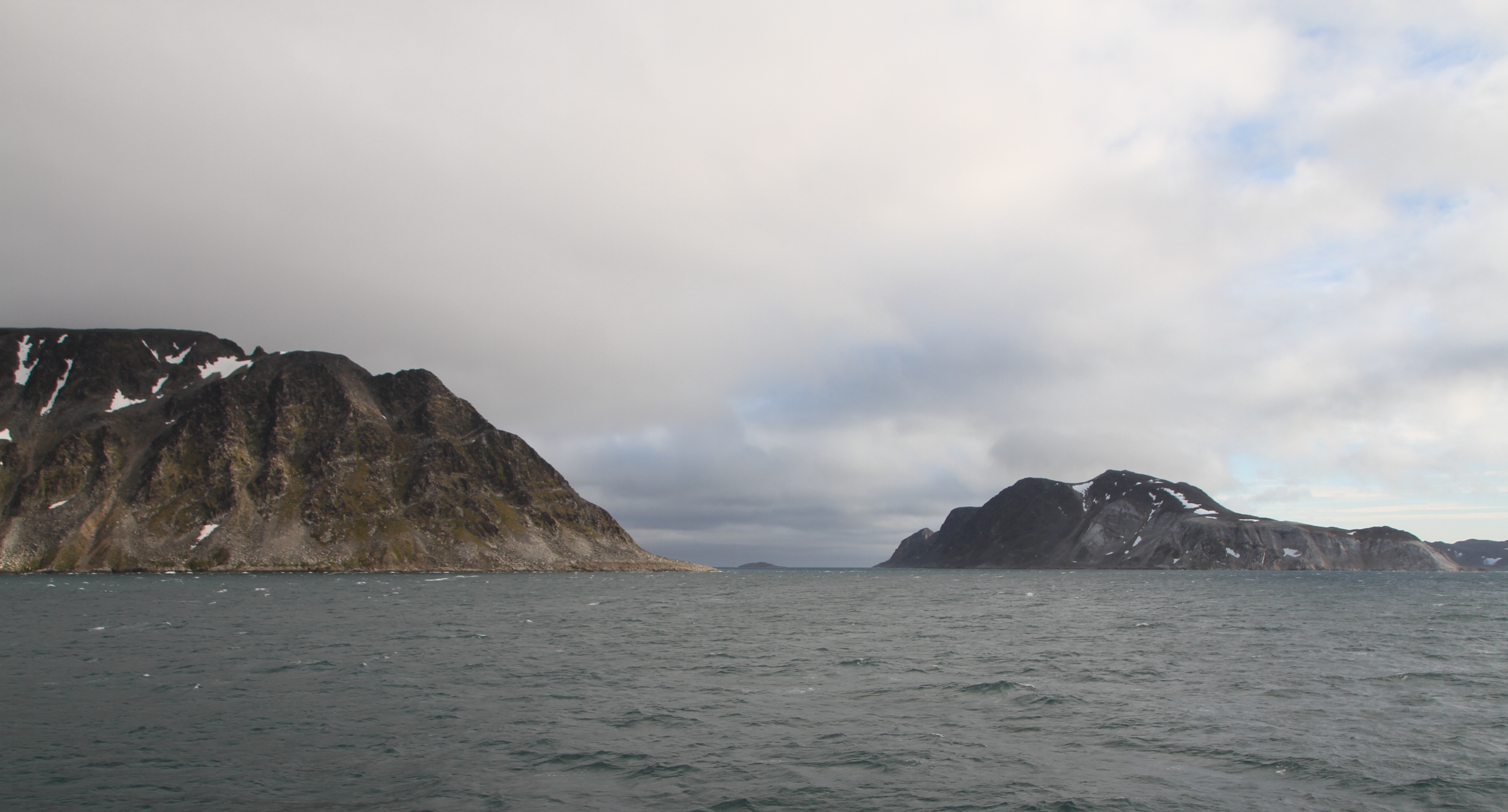
Fair Haven, with the islands Nordvestøyane and surroundings.

Nordvestøyane (The Northwestern Islands) is an archipelago in Albert I Land at Spitsbergen, Svalbard. Among the islands in the group are Fuglesongen (4.1 km^{2}) and Klovningen (2.2 km^{2}).
