= Scheibukta =

Bay in Svalbard, Norway

Coordinates: 79.6312°N 11.1353°E

Scheibukta is a bay in Albert I Land at Spitsbergen, Svalbard. The bay is located on Reuschhalvøya, outside Scheibreen and west of St. Laurentiusbukta. It is named after Norwegian geologist Per Schei.
