= Raudfjordbreen =

Glacier in Svalbard

Coordinates: 79.6113°N 12.1417°E

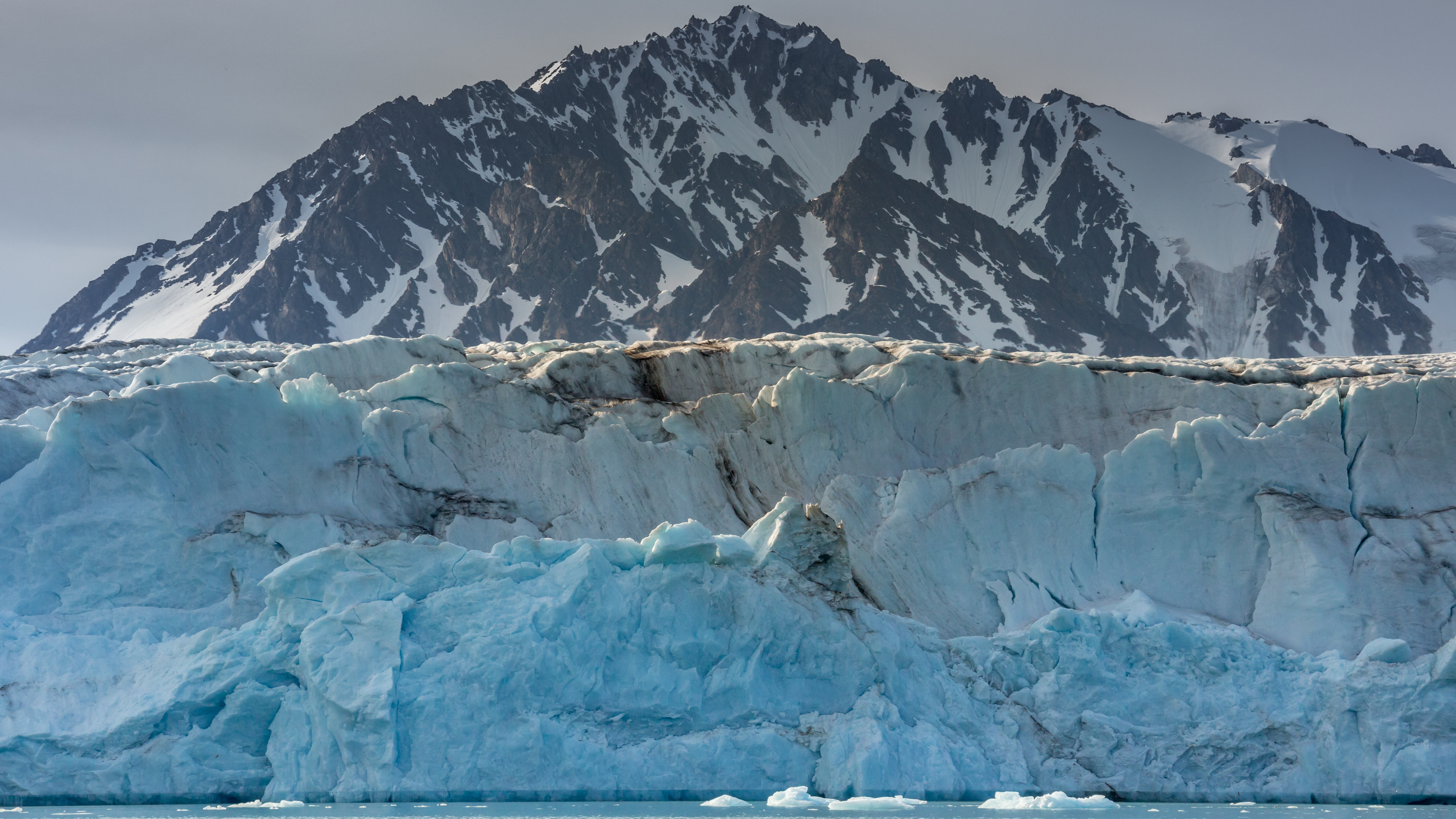
Raudfjordbreen glacier front, Svalbard

Raudfjordbreen is a glacier at Spitsbergen, Svalbard, on the divide between Albert I Land and Haakon VII Land. It has a length of 18 kilometers and debouches into Klinckowströmfjorden, the eastern branch of Raudfjorden.
