= Fuglefjorden =

Fjord in Svalbard, Norway

Coordinates: 79.7763°N 11.4419°E

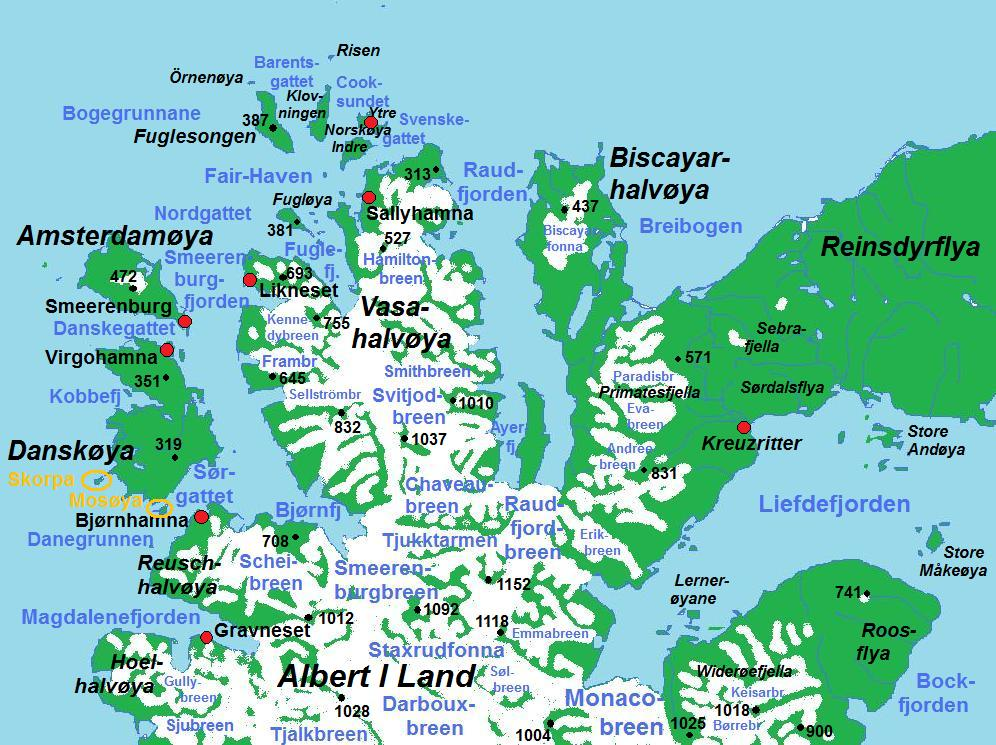
Fugle-fj. on the area map

Fuglefjorden is a fjord in Albert I Land at Spitsbergen, Svalbard. It is located on the northern side of the peninsula Vasahalvøya, and has a length of three nautical miles. The island of Fugløya divides the fjord into two branches. The eastern branch has several islets, skerries and shoals.
