= Jessiefjellet =

Mountain in Prins Karls Forland, Svalbard

Coordinates: 78.5977°N 11.0132°E

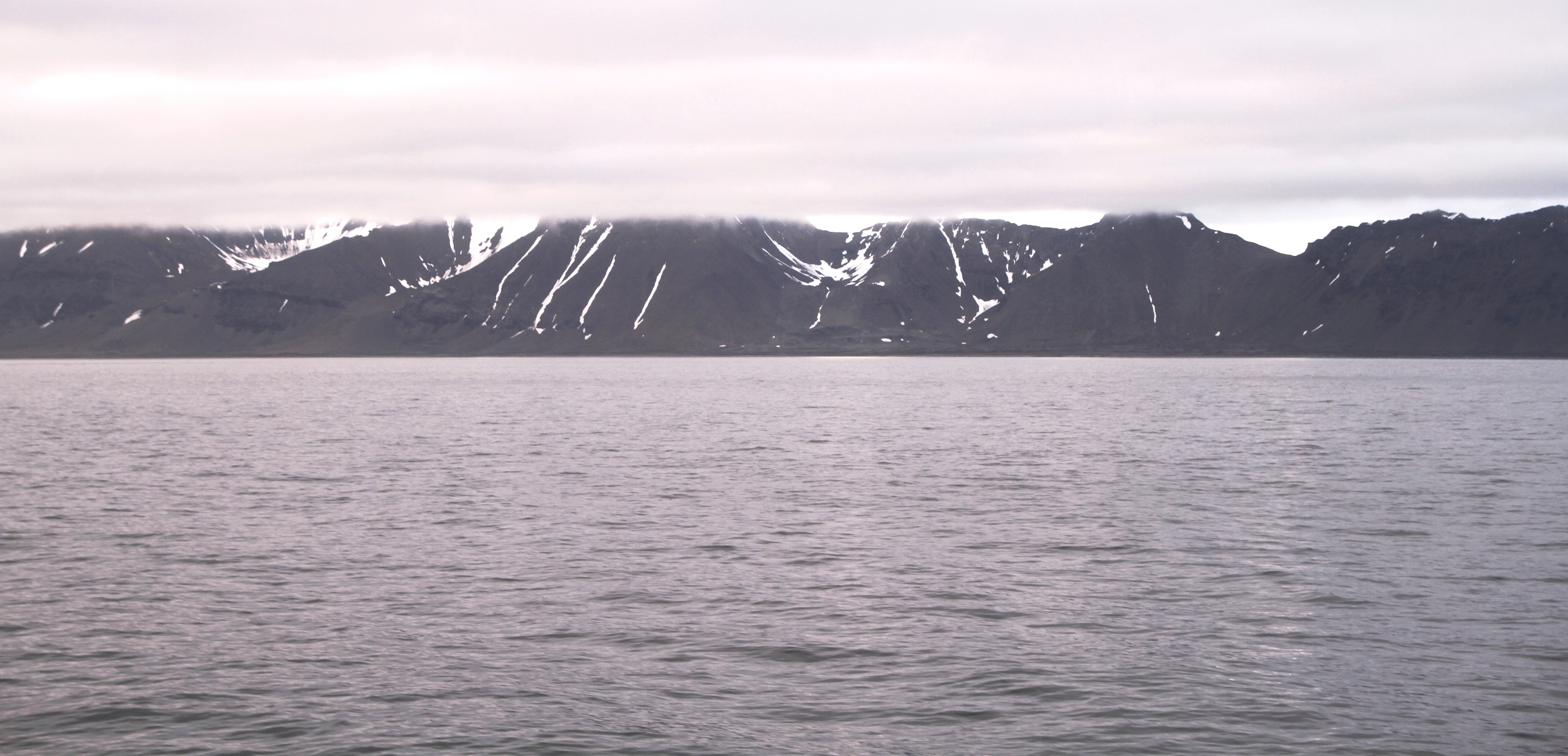
A view of the island Forlandet (Prins Karls Forland) from west to east, showing part of the northern mountain chain including Jessiefjellet

Jessiefjellet is a mountain in Prins Karls Forland, Svalbard. It has a height above mean sea level of 1,033 with a pointed summit. It is named after Jessie Bruce, wife of Scottish Arctic explorer William S. Bruce. Jessiefjellet is part of the Grampianfjella mountain ridge.
