= Thijmen Jacobsz Hinlopen =

Dutch merchant (1572–1637)

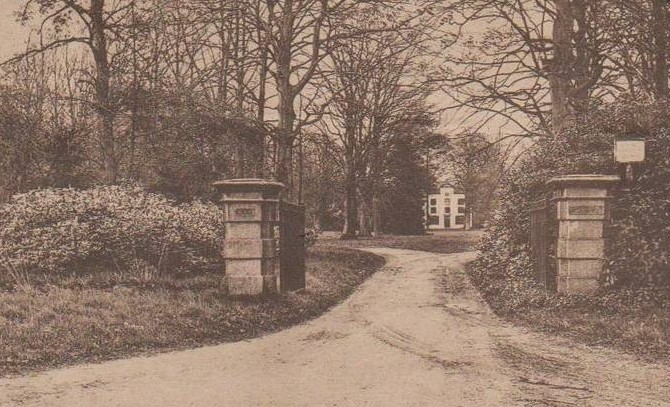
Jacob Olie - Hofstede Oud-Bussum

Thijmen Jacobsz Hinlopen (also Tymen; Thymen; Hinloopen; 1572–1637), was one of the leaders of the Dutch merchant and whaling company of Noordsche Compagnie beginning in 1617 and participant in the New Netherland Company, interested in furs. Thijmen was a prominent trader in corn from the Baltic carrying on trade to Genoa and Portugal.

He was the namesake of Cape Henlopen, Delaware and Hinlopen Strait.

== Family ==
The Hinlopen family is said to have originated from Brabant. After moving to Amsterdam, several of the Hinlopens became wealthy during the Golden Age. In 1629 he bought an estate near Bussum.

Thijmen married Anna Verlaer. The art collector nl:Michiel Hinloopen was their son and Jan Jacobszoon Hinlopen was his nephew.
