= Fuglesongen =

Island in Svalbard, Norway

Coordinates: 79.8521°N 11.3014°E

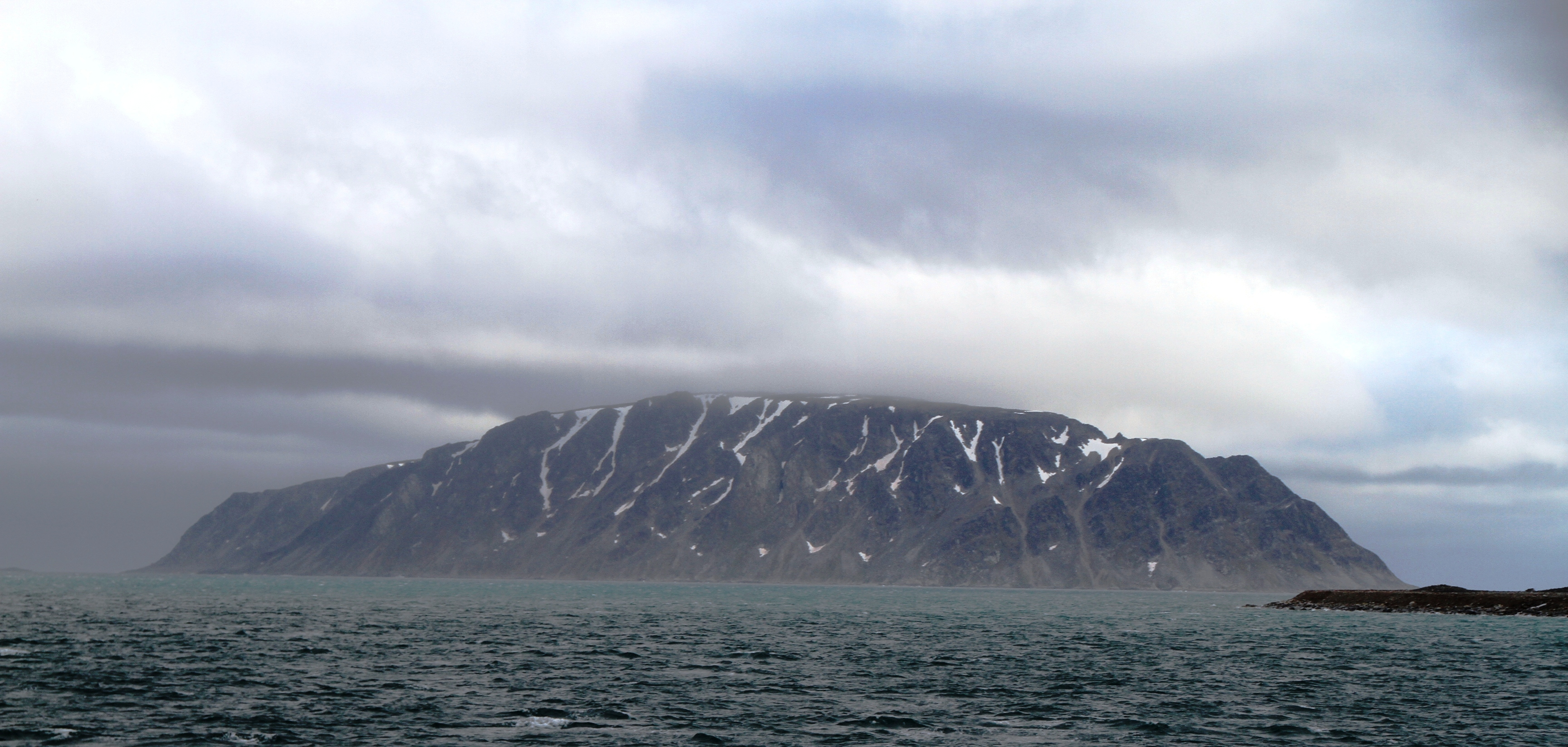

Fuglesongen (The Bird Song) is an island in Albert I Land at Spitsbergen, Svalbard. It has an area of about 4.1 square kilometres (1.6 sq mi), and is located in the archipelago of Nordvestøyane. Its highest peak is 387 metres (1,270 ft) above sea level. It is named after its large number of birds, among which the little auk is particularly common.
