= John Young Buchanan =

Scottish chemist, oceanographer and Arctic explorer (1844–1925)

John Young Buchanan FRSE FRS FCS (20 February 1844 – 16 October 1925) was a Scottish chemist, oceanographer and Arctic explorer. He was an important part of the Challenger Expedition.

== Life ==
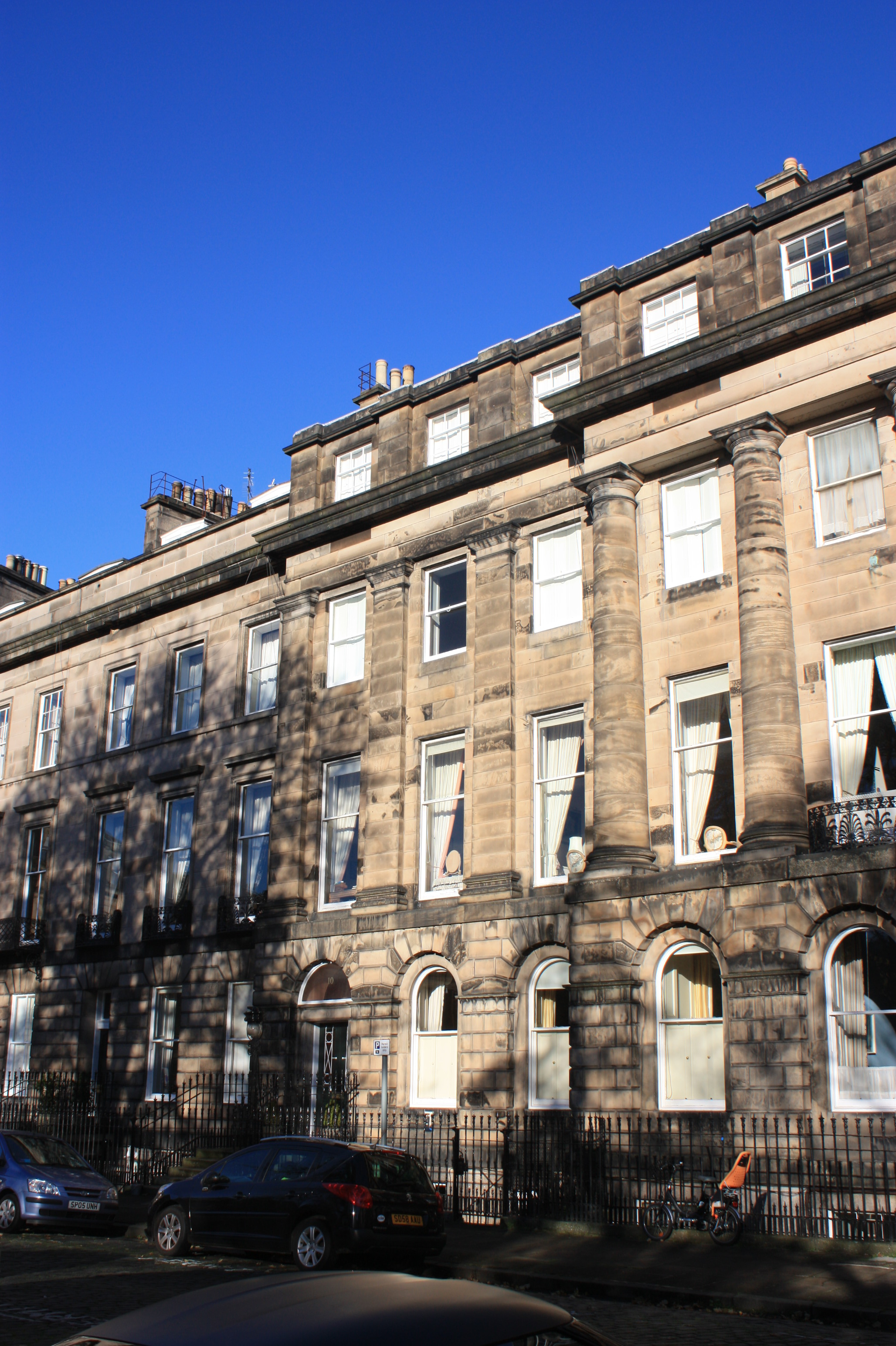
Buchanan's Edinburgh house at 10 Moray Place

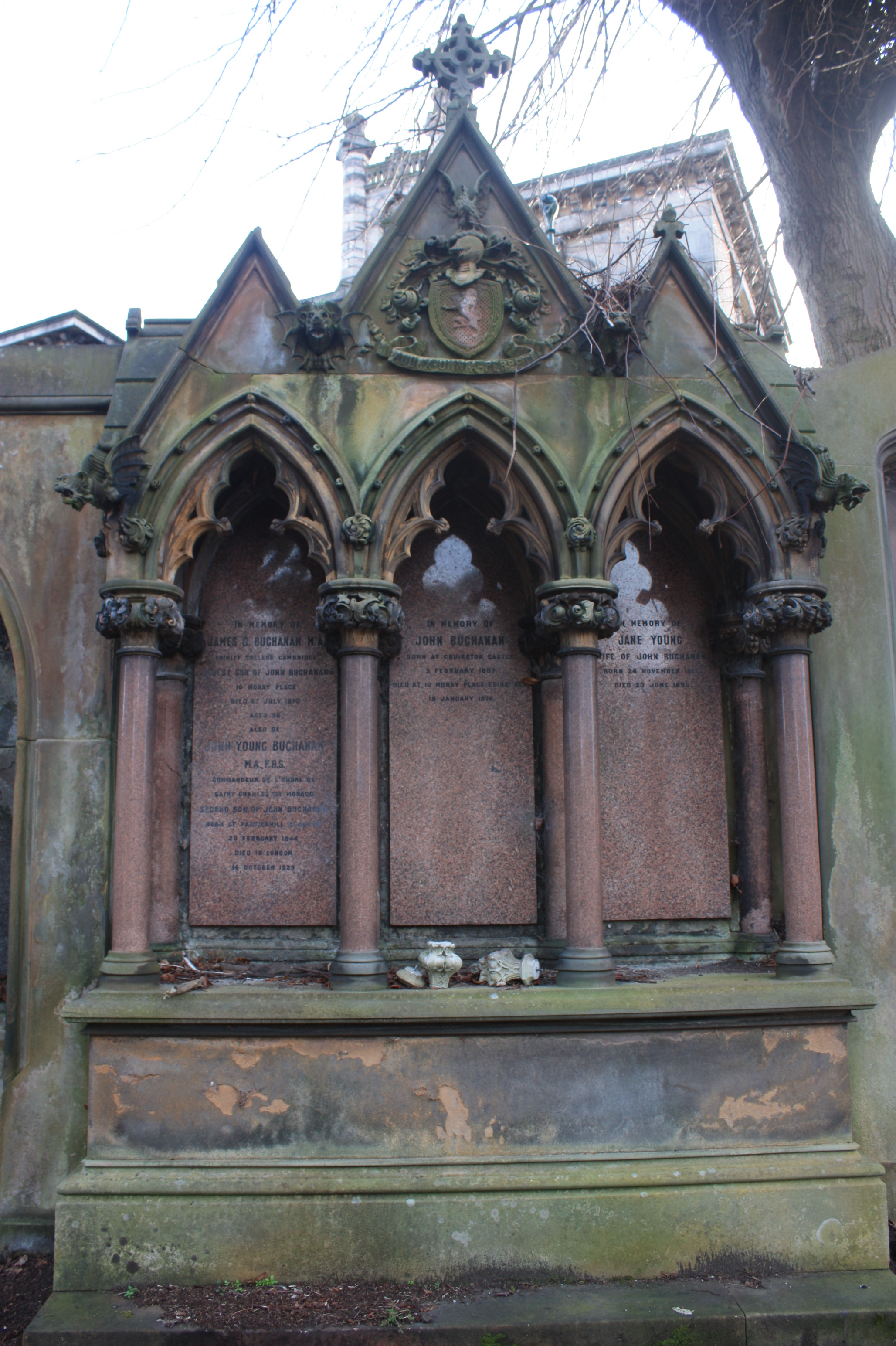
The grave of John Young Buchanan, Dean Cemetery

He was born in Partickhill, Glasgow on 20 February 1844, the son of Jane Young and her husband, John Buchanan of Dowanhill, a relatively affluent landowner. His brother was the statesman Thomas Ryburn Buchanan.

He attended Glasgow High School and then studied chemistry at the University of Glasgow. He also spent time in Europe studying at the universities of Marburg, Leipzig, Bonn and Paris. He graduated in 1863.

His first role was as an assistant to Prof Alexander Crum Brown at the University of Edinburgh.

In 1870 he was elected a Fellow of the Royal Society of Edinburgh, his proposer being Alexander Crum Brown. He was then living at the prestigious address of 10 Moray Place in Edinburgh's West End. The Society awarded him its Keith Prize for 1885 to 1887.

In 1873, he was appointed as a chemist and physicist on the three year Challenger Expedition.

His ideas on ocean currents contradicted the long-established views laid down by Humboldt.

In 1887 he was elected a Fellow of the Royal Society. His address was then 10 Moray Place, a large Victorian townhouse on the Moray Estate in the west end of Edinburgh.

From 1889 until 1903 he lectured in geography at the University of Cambridge.

He died in London on 16 October 1925, aged 81. His body was returned to Edinburgh and he is buried in Lord's Row with his parents, against the west wall of Dean Cemetery.

== Publications ==
- On the Distribution of Salt in the Ocean (1877)
- On the Distribution of Temperatures in Loch Lomond in the Autumn of 1885 (1886)
- On Similarities of the Physical Geography of the Great Oceans (1886)
- Experimental Researches on the Specific Gravity of the Displacement of some Saline Solutions (1912)
- Comptes Rendus of Observation and Reasoning (1917)
- Accounts Rendered of Work Done and Things Seen (1919)

== Geographical recognition ==
- Buchananhalvøya in Spitzbergen is named after Buchanan
- The glacier Buchananisen in Svalbard is named after Buchanan
