= Parnasset =

Mountain in Svalbard, Norway

Coordinates: 78.6193°N 10.9848°E

Parnasset is a mountain in Prins Karls Forland, Svalbard. The mountain has a height of 1,000 m.a.s.l. and is located on Grampianfjella, between Stigbreen and Parnassbreen.
