= Charlesfjellet =

Mountain in Svalbard, Norway

Coordinates: 78.6053°N 11.0078°E

Charlesfjellet is a mountain in Prins Karls Forland, Svalbard that is 969 m.a.s.l. tall and located on Grampianfjella. In 1910, it was used as a trigonometric station.
