= Klovningen =

Island in Albert I Land at Spitsbergen, Svalbard, Norway

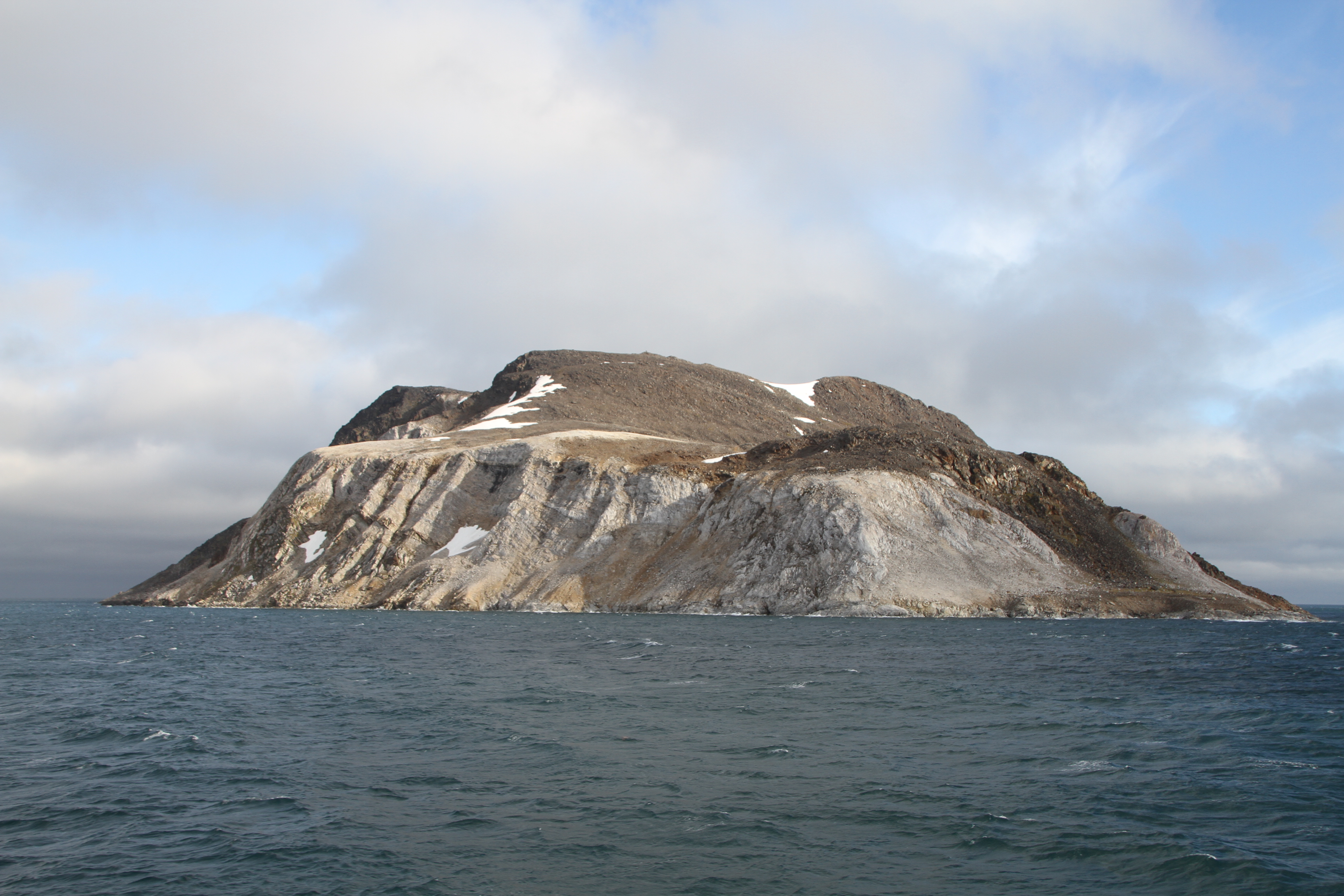
- Photo from the outer northwestern sea inlet of Spitsbergen, called Fair Haven, with the islands Nordvestøyane and surroundings. Albert I Land, Spitsbergen, Svalbard (Norway).

- Location within Svalbard

Geography
- Coordinates: 79°52′00″N 11°30′00″E
- Archipelago: Nordvestøyane
- Area: 2.2 km^{2} (0.85 sq mi)
- Highest point: 292

Administration
- Norway

Klovningen is an island in Albert I Land at Spitsbergen, Svalbard. It has an area of about 2.2 km^{2}, and is located in the archipelago of Nordvestøyane. Its highest peak is 292 m.a.s.l., and the island is recognizable by a sharp cleft which separates two summits in the northern part.
