= Phippsfjellet =

Mountain in Svalbard, Norway

Coordinates: 78.6392°N 10.9464°E

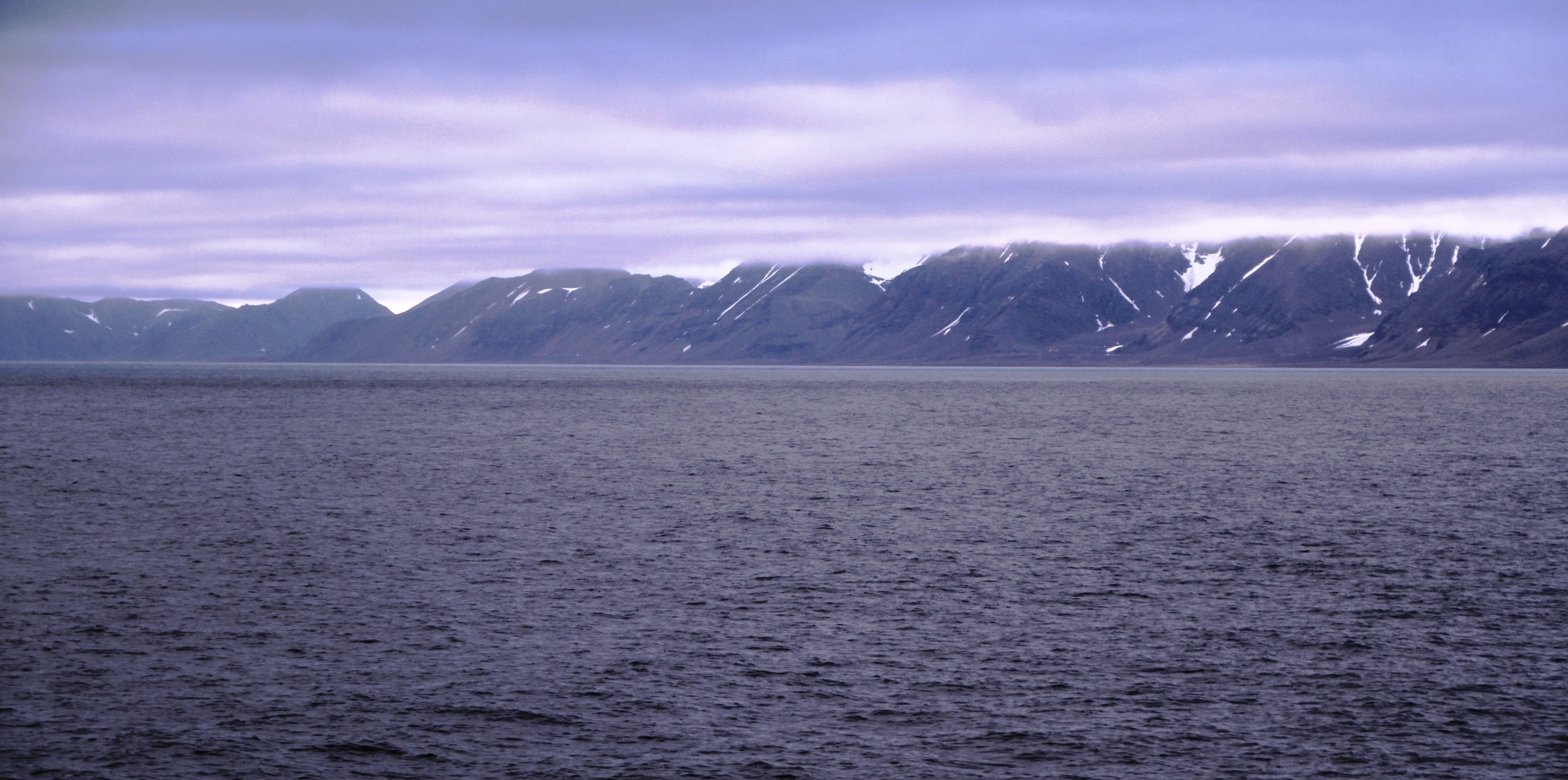

Phippsfjellet is a mountain on Prins Karls Forland, Svalbard. It has a height of 1,013 m.a.s.l. and is located on the ridge of Grampianfjella. The mountain is named after British Arctic explorer and naval officer Constantine Phipps, 2nd Baron Mulgrave. Further southeast on the ridge is the mountain of Phippsaksla.
