= Nevis (disambiguation) =

Nevis is an island in the Caribbean and part of the Federation of Saint Kitts and Nevis.

Nevis may also refer to:

== Places ==
- Nevis, Alberta, a hamlet in Canada
- Nevis, Iran, a village in Qom Province
- Nevis, Minnesota, small town in the US
- Petit Nevis, a small privately owned island in the Grenadines
- Ben Nevis, the highest mountain in the British Isles, located in Scotland
- Glen Nevis, a glen in Lochaber, Highland, Scotland
- Loch Nevis, a sea loch on the west coast of Scotland, not associated with Ben Nevis
- Nevis range, a ski area near Ben Nevis, Scotland
- River Nevis, a river near Ben Nevis in Scotland
- Nevis River, a river in New Zealand
  - Nevis Highwire Platform, a Bungee platform above the Nevis River

== Other uses ==
- Edwin C. Nevis (1926–2011), American psychologist
- Nevis Laboratories, operated by Columbia University
- Nevisport, an outdoor clothing firm founded in Fort William, near Ben Nevis

== See also ==
- Knock Nevis, a Norwegian owned supertanker
- Nevus, a number of different, usually benign, pigmented lesions of the skin, including most birthmarks and moles
  - Dysplastic nevus, an atypical mole whose appearance is different from that of common moles
