= Buchananisen =

Glacier in Svalbard, Norway

Coordinates: 78.6621°N 11.0111°E

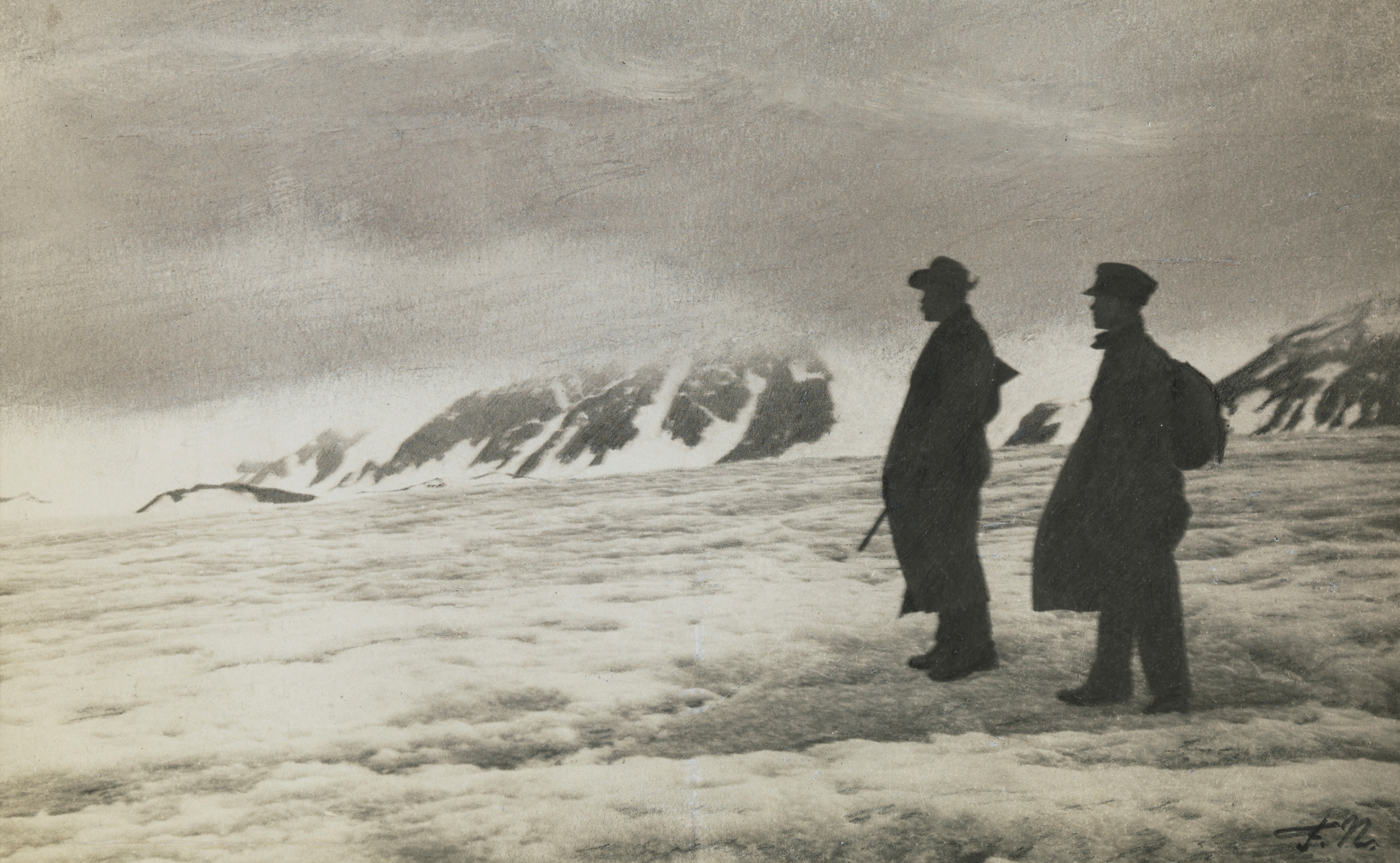
Fridtjof Nansen with his son Kåre Nansen on Buchananisen

Buchananisen is a glacier in Prins Karls Forland, Svalbard. The glacier has a width of about twelve kilometers and is split into two parts by the ridge of Buchananryggen. It is named after Arctic explorer John Young Buchanan.
