= Monacofjellet =

Mountain in Svalbard, Norway

Coordinates: 78.6567°N 10.9176°E

Monacofjellet is a mountain in Prins Karls Forland, Svalbard. It has a height of 1,084 m.a.s.l., and is the highest mountain of Forlandet. Monacofjellet is part of the Grampianfjella mountain ridge.
