= Ayerfjorden =

Fjord in Svalbard, Norway

Coordinates: 79.6950°N 12.0700°E

Ayerfjorden is the western branch of Raudfjorden in Albert I Land at Spitsbergen, Svalbard. The glacier Chauveaubreen debouches into the fjord.

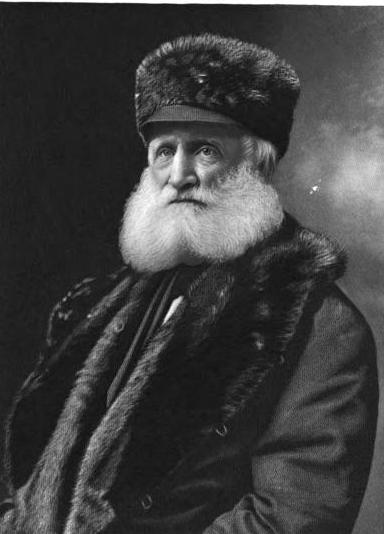
The fjord is named after Frederick Ayer.

The fjord is named after American businessman Frederick Ayer (1822–1918), who started the company Arctic Coal jointly with John Munro Longyear.
