= Johannes Gerard van Dillen =

Dutch historian

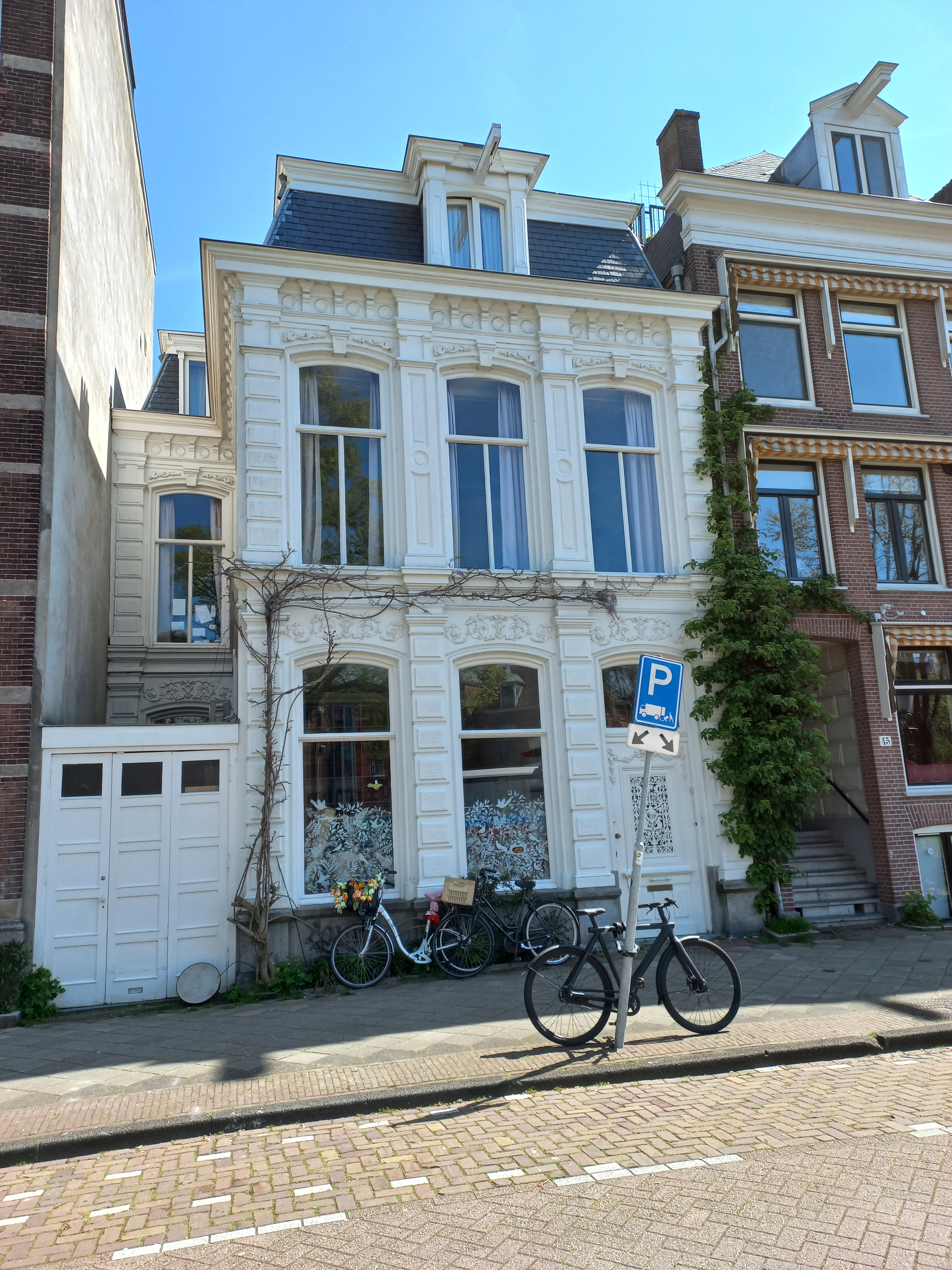
Van Dillen lived at Ruysdaelskade 43 in Amsterdam.

Johannes Gerard van Dillen (20 September 1883, in Amsterdam – 26 December 1969, in Amsterdam) was a Dutch economic historian.

== Biography ==
Van Dillen completed gymnasium in Amsterdam and earned his doctorate from the University of Amsterdam in 1914. From 1915 to 1921, he served as privatdozent in economic history at the university. In 1920, he assumed a role at the Bureau for the Rijks Geschiedkundige Publicatiën (RPG), an institution dedicated to publishing historical sources. Additionally, he held the position of secretary in the editorial committee of the Tijdschrift voor Geschiedenis, Land- en Volkenkunde.

Despite being a socialist who disapproved of bolshevism, Van Dillen faced a surprising challenge when Nicolaas Wilhelmus Posthumus recommended him as a successor for a chair at the Nederlandsche Handels-Hoogeschool in Rotterdam. The school hesitated considering him "too red".

In 1933, due to budget constraints, Van Dillen left the RGP. In 1934 he again became a private lecturer, this time at the University of Utrecht. Remarkably, when offered a professorship in 1949, he declined, preferring to remain in Amsterdam.

== Legacy ==
Van Dillen is credited with authoring several significant works on the history of trade and banking in Amsterdam and the Netherlands. He also played a pivotal role in editing primary sources related to the Wisselbank and guilds.

== Works ==
- History of the Principal Public Banks by J.G. Van Dillen (1934)
- Het oudste aandeelhouders-register van de Kamer Amsterdam der Oost-Indische Compagnie (1958)
- J.G. van Dillen (1970) Van rijkdom en regenten. Handboek tot de economische en sociale geschiedenis van Nederland tijdens de Republiek
- Teksten van J.G. van Dillen in tijdschriften en andere boeken

=== Online publications ===
- Bronnen tot de geschiedenis van het bedrijfsleven en gildewezen van Amsterdam (in Dutch)
- Bronnen tot de geschiedenis der wisselbanken (Amsterdam, Middelburg, Delft, Rotterdam) 1603-1820 (in Dutch)
