= Phippsaksla =

Phippsaksla is an unusually shaped rock imaged by NASA Perseverance rover in September 2025 outside Jezero Crater on Mars. During exploration of a fractured bedrock outcrop at a site nicknamed "Vernodden," Perseverance imaged the rock, which is believed to be non-Martian.

== Etymology ==
The Perseverance team named the rock Phippsaksla after a place in Svalbard. NASA often names Martian rocks and features after locations on Earth to help scientists identify and discuss them more easily.

== Discovery ==
The Perseverance rover first imaged Phippsaksla on Sol 1612 (September 2, 2025) and again on Sol 1629 (September 19, 2025). The rock distinct sculpted and elevated appearance standing out compared to the flat and fragmented surrounding bedrock prompted further analysis. The Perseverance rover used the SuperCam instrument to analyze the rock composition.

== Physical properties and composition ==
Phippsaksla measures approximately 80 centimetres (≈ 31 inches) across. Using the rover's SuperCam instrument (a laser + spectrometer), scientists detected high levels of iron and nickel in the rock. This iron-nickel composition is characteristic of iron-nickel meteorites, which are believed to form in the cores of large asteroids, rather than typical Martian bedrock.

== Significance ==
Meteorites like Phippsaksla are scientifically important as they potentially preserve material from early Solar System bodies (asteroids), and studying them can shed light on the history of asteroid impacts and planetary material transfer. Scientists are cautious; further in-situ investigations are necessary to confirm that Phippsaksla is genuinely an iron-nickel meteorite, and not a rock formed on Mars under unusual conditions.

Evidences indicate that the Phippsaksla specimen likely did not originate on Mars itself. Instead, it appears to have been part of a meteoritic body that impacted the Martian surface in the distant past.

== See also ==
- Jake Matijevic (rock)
- List of individual rocks
