= Vasahalvøya =

Peninsula in Svalbard, Norway

Coordinates: 79.6956°N 11.6466°E

Vasahalvøya is a peninsula in Albert I Land at Spitsbergen, Svalbard. The peninsula is named after Gustav Vasa. It is located between the fjords of Smeerenburgfjorden and Raudfjorden. The peninsula is filled with ruggy and pointed mountains and glacier filled valleys. The highest peak is Stortinden.
