= Noordsche Compagnie =

Dutch whaling cartel of the 17th century

- Industry: Whaling
- Founded: January 27, 1614; 412 years ago in Vlieland, Netherlands
- Founder: Jacques Nicquet; Tymen J. Hinlopen
- Defunct: 1642
- Fate: Dissolved
- Headquarters: Netherlands

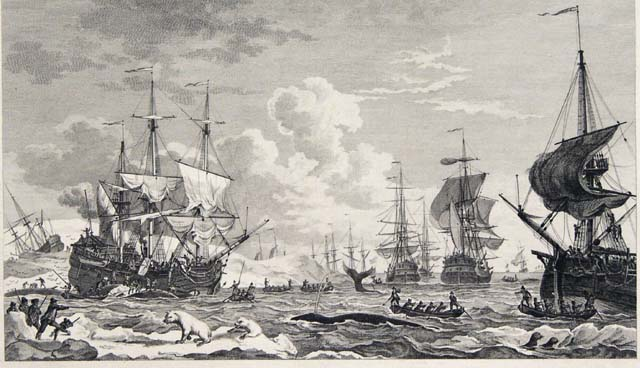
Whaling, by H. Kobell, Jr.

The Noordsche Compagnie (English: Northern Company) was a Dutch cartel in the whaling trade, founded by several cities in the Netherlands in 1614 and operating until 1642. Soon after its founding, it became entangled in territorial conflicts with England, Denmark-Norway, France, and other groups within the Netherlands.

It was also known as the Groenlandse Compagnie (English: Greenland Company), but the name is misleading today since the "Greenland" referred to is Svalbard, previously thought to either be identical or connected to the island of Greenland discovered and colonized by the Norse.

== History ==
In 1598, a whale beached at Wijk aan Zee. The animal was sold for 126 guilders and the jaw was transported to Dillenburg and given to Jan van Nassau as a gift.

In 1612, the first mention is made of a commercial expedition to Novaya Zemlya after it was concluded that whaling at the Cape of Good Hope in the southern Atlantic offered little prospects of profit. Willem Cornelisz. van Muyden was one of the first skippers to set sail to the North. In 1613, he was the commander of the Neptunus and the Fortuyn, two ships that were sent to Spitsbergen (modern Svalbard, then considered part of Greenland) to hunt for whales. On board were twelve or thirteen French Basques. The remaining crew of 48 men came from North Holland.

On 27 January 1614, the Noordsche Compagnie was founded for a period of two years on Vlieland. Tymen J. Hinlopen and Jacques Nicquet were amongst the original investors. In 1617, the charter was renewed for another four years and, in 1622, for another twelve.

Whaling was done in the summer months. Ships and crew left the ports of the Dutch Republic in May or June. After a three-week journey they arrived at the coastal waters of Spitsbergen, Jan Mayen, or Bear Island. In August, September, or October the ships returned to the Republic. Soon whaling stations were established on Jan Mayen and Spitsbergen, the best known of these being Smeerenburg. These stations saved much space in the cargohold of the ships, and also relieved the stench. For years the Noordsche Compagnie controlled the monopoly for whale oil. For every expedition, participants would invest capital. When the expedition had returned, the profit would immediately be divided amongst the investors.

== Organization ==
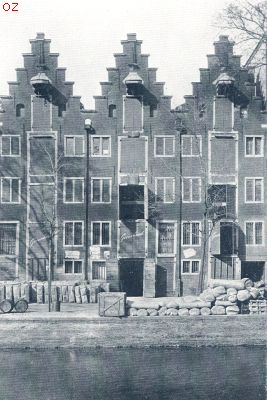
The Greenland warehouses on the Keizersgracht 40–44. Built in 1621. Photo from 1924, two years after the renovation. Originally there were five, of which only these three remain

The administration of the Noordsche Compagnie was divided into five chambers. These were relatively independent and located in Amsterdam, Hoorn, Enkhuizen, Rotterdam, and Delft. Each city had its own installations on the polar islands. In 1616 the Zeelandic Lampsin family took part in the company. From then on Vlissingen, Middelburg and Veere also had a chamber. In 1634 the charter was renewed for another eight years. In 1636 two Frisian chambers were created: Harlingen and Stavoren.

== Trading territories ==
The trading area of the Noordsche Compagnie stretched from the Davis Strait to Novaya Zemlya, north of Russia. The company did not make any claims to the territory, they were only concerned with their trading-monopoly.

Initially the company made much use of Basque harpooners and navigators. Aside from whales, walrus and seals were also hunted. The polar bear hunt resulted in skins and fur. Whale baleen was used to make picture frames for paintings, walking sticks and knifehilts.

Michiel de Ruyter, the most famous Dutch admiral, served as pilot on a ship of the Noordsche Compagnie from 1633 to 1635. He was probably familiar with the route from the time that he was still a sailor.

The company was dissolved in 1642. The company had started receiving intense competition from Dutch interlopers and Danish whalers. Whaling was privatized, and taken over by the private sector.

The participation of the population of the West Frisian Islands to whaling is evident from the tombstones of the ship-captains buried there, which were made from whale jawbones.

== See also ==
- European chartered companies founded around the 17th century (in French)

== Bibliography ==
- Hart, S. (1957) De eerste Nederlandse tocht ter walvisvaart. In: Jaarboek Amstelodamum, p. 27-64. (Dutch)
- J.G. van Dillen (1970) Van Rijkdom en Regenten. Handboek tot de Economische en Sociale Geschiedenis van Nederland tijdens de Republiek, p. 248-55. (Dutch)
