= Danes Island =

Island in Svalbard, Norway

Coordinates: 79°40′N 10°54′E

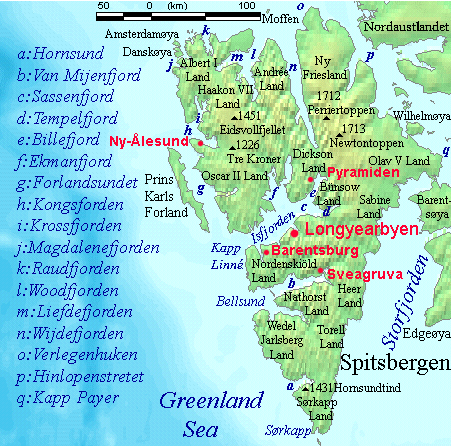
Danes Island (Danskøya) lies to the northwest of Spitsbergen.

Danes Island (Norwegian: Danskøya) is an island in Norway's Svalbard archipelago in the Arctic Ocean with an area of 40.6 km^{2} (15.7 sq mi). It lies just off the northwest coast of Spitsbergen, the largest island in the archipelago, near to Magdalenefjorden. Just to the north lies Amsterdam Island. Most of Svalbard's islands, including Danes Island, are uninhabited; only Spitsbergen, Bjørnøya and Hopen have settlements.

== History ==
In 1631 the Danish established a permanent station in Robbe Bay (Kobbefjorden), which was abandoned in 1658. Another station was established by the Dutch in Houcker Bay (Virgohamna), on the north side of Danes Island in the 1630s. It was called the "Cookery of Harlingen." The remains of this station were seen by Friderich Martens in 1671.

The island is the location from which S. A. Andrée's Arctic balloon expedition of 1897 started. Andrée's hydrogen balloon crashed on the pack ice three days after its launch from Danes Island, and after wandering and drifting for nearly three months, the explorers finally perished on Kvitøya, also in Svalbard.

== Gallery ==
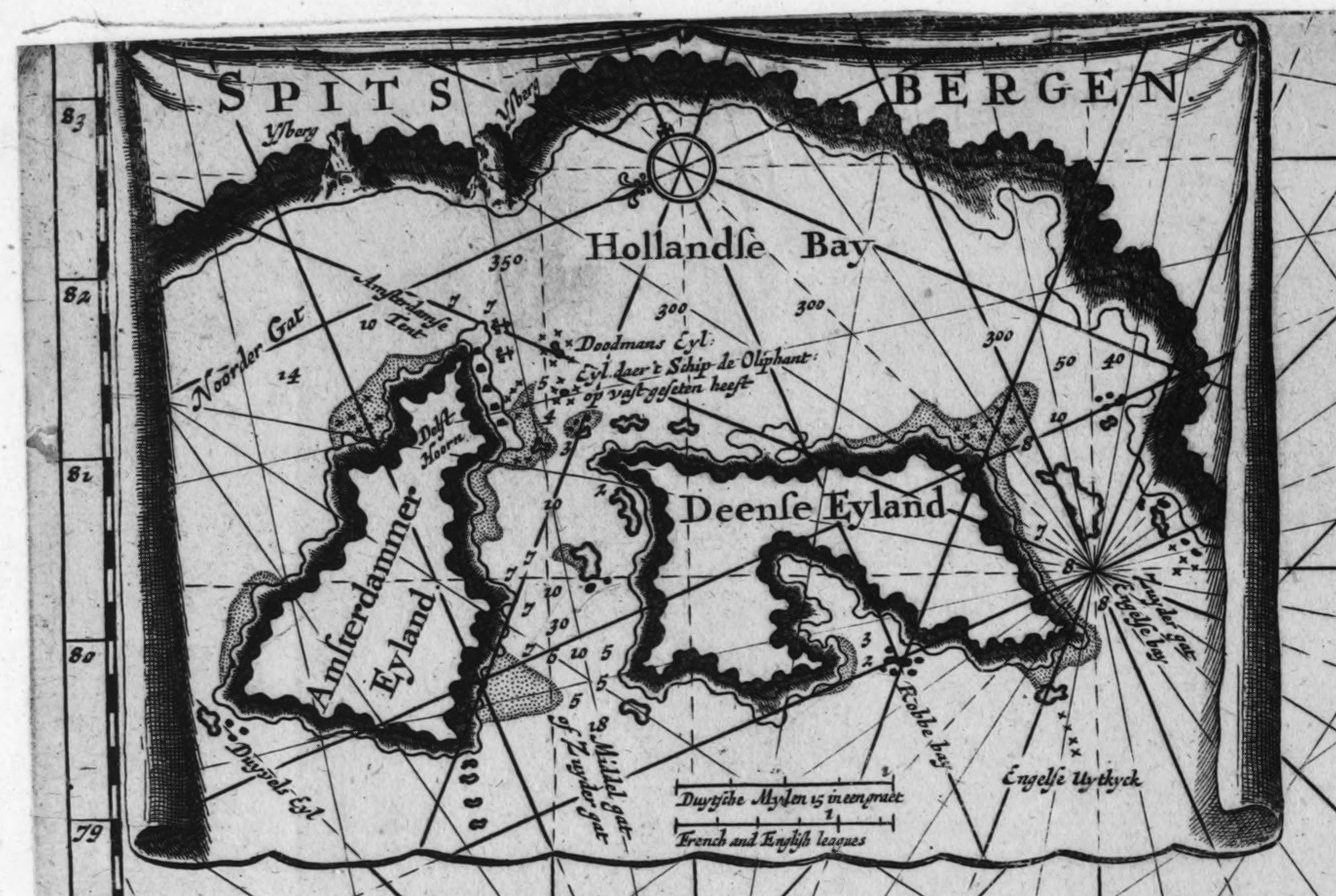
17th century Dutch map of "Deense Eyland".

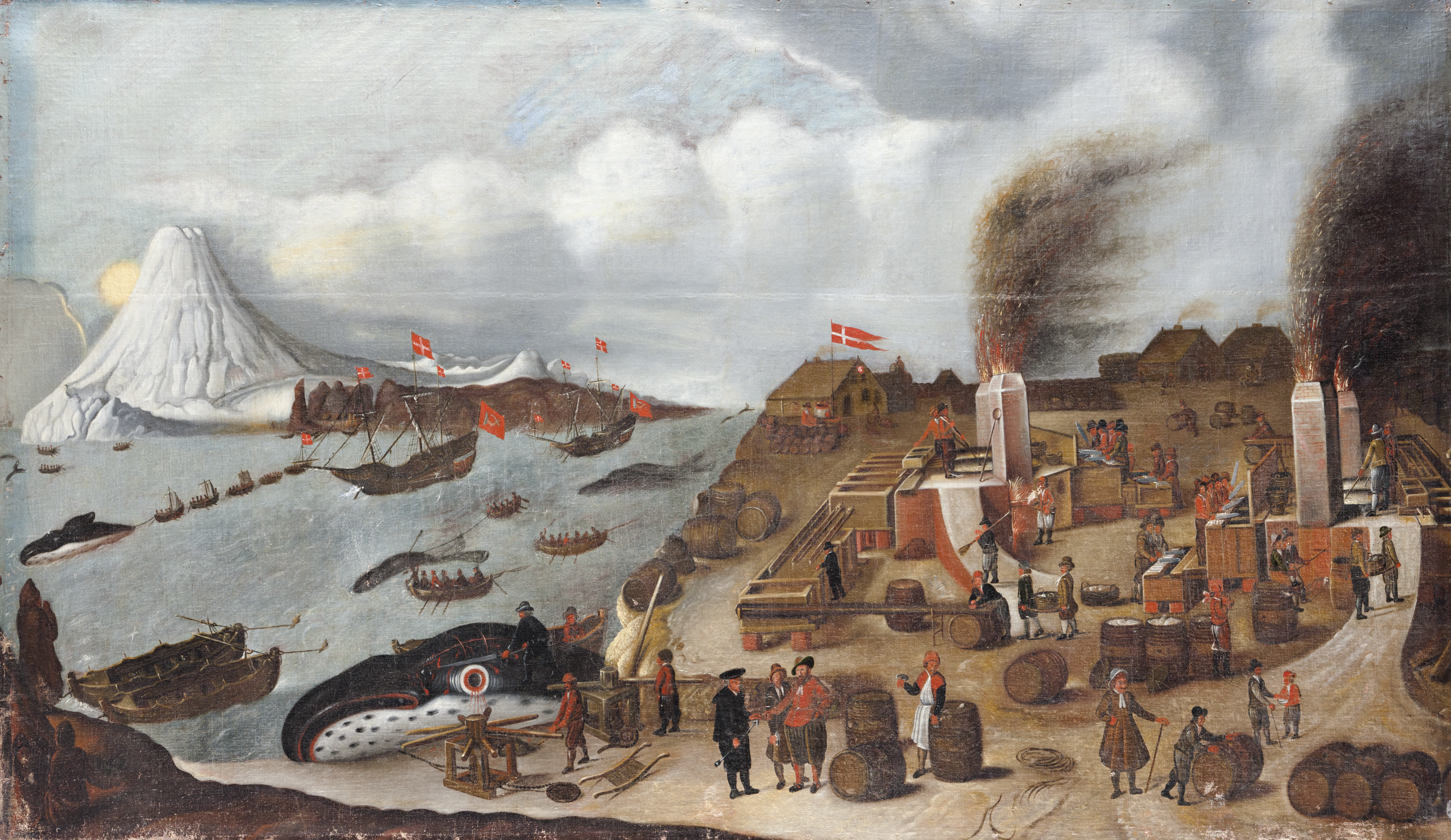
Whaling on Danes Island, by Abraham Speeck, 1634. Skokloster Castle.

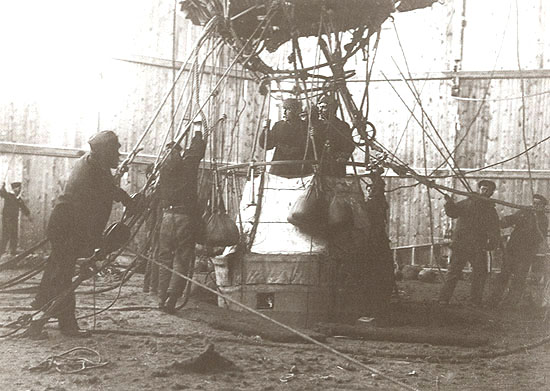
S. A. Andrée's balloon before takeoff on July 11, 1897.

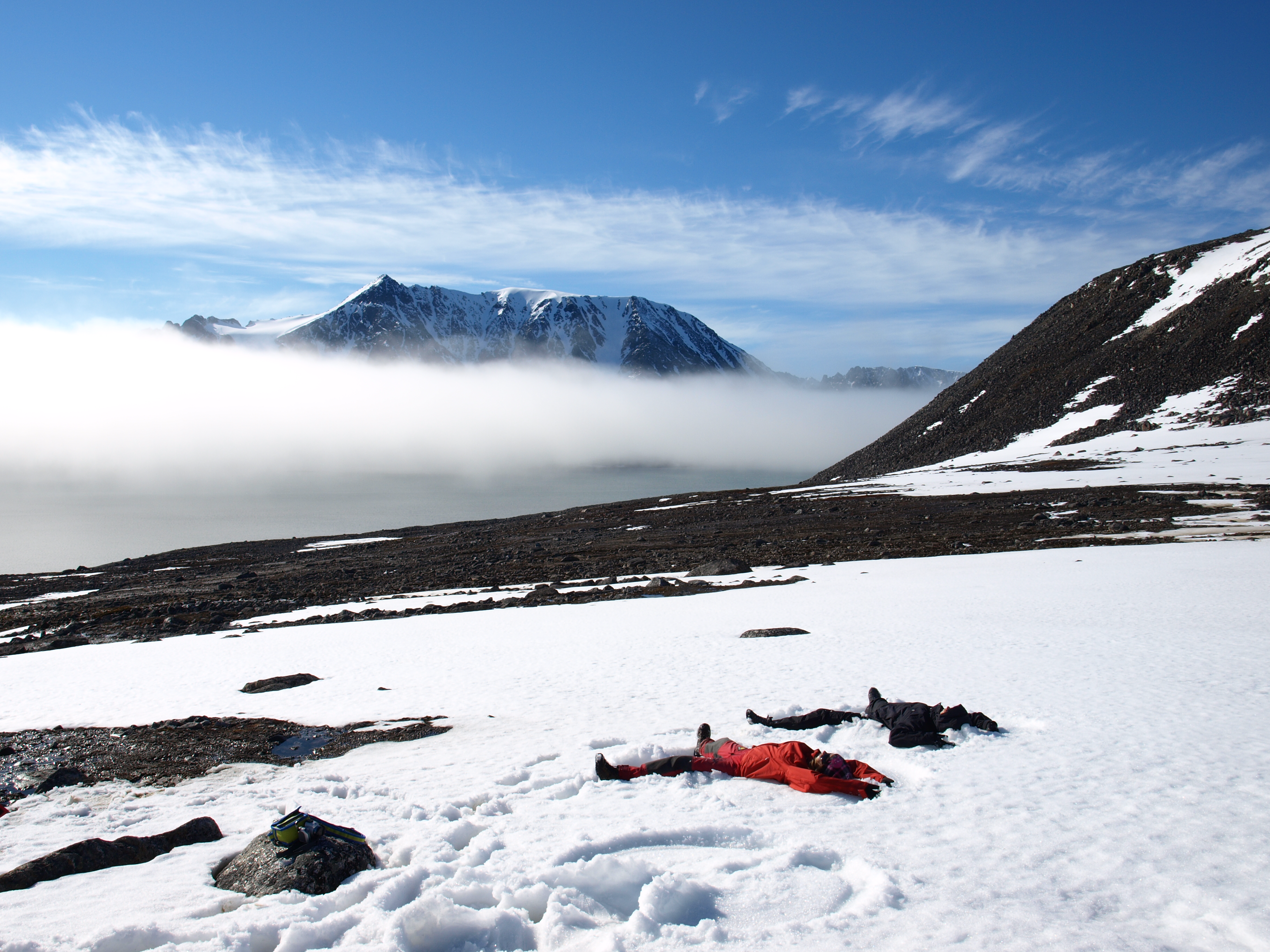
Making snow-angels on Danes Island on July 19, 2008.

== See also ==
- List of islands in the Arctic Ocean
