= Reuschhalvøya =

Peninsula in Svalbard, Norway

Coordinates: 79.6041°N 11.1887°E

Reuschhalvøya is a peninsula in Albert I Land at Spitsbergen, Svalbard. The peninsula is named after geologist Hans Henrik Reusch. It is located south of Smeerenburgfjorden and Bjørnfjorden, and north of Magdalenefjorden. The largest glacier of the peninsula is Scheibreen, while Smeerenburgbreen is located east of the peninsula.
