= Amsterdam Island (Spitsbergen) =

Island

Coordinates: 79°40′N 10°30′E

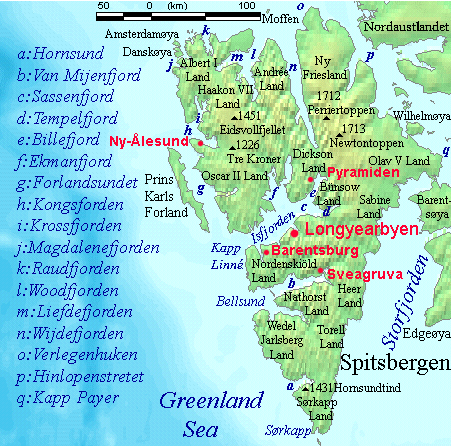
Amsterdam Island is located off Spitsbergen's northwestern coast.

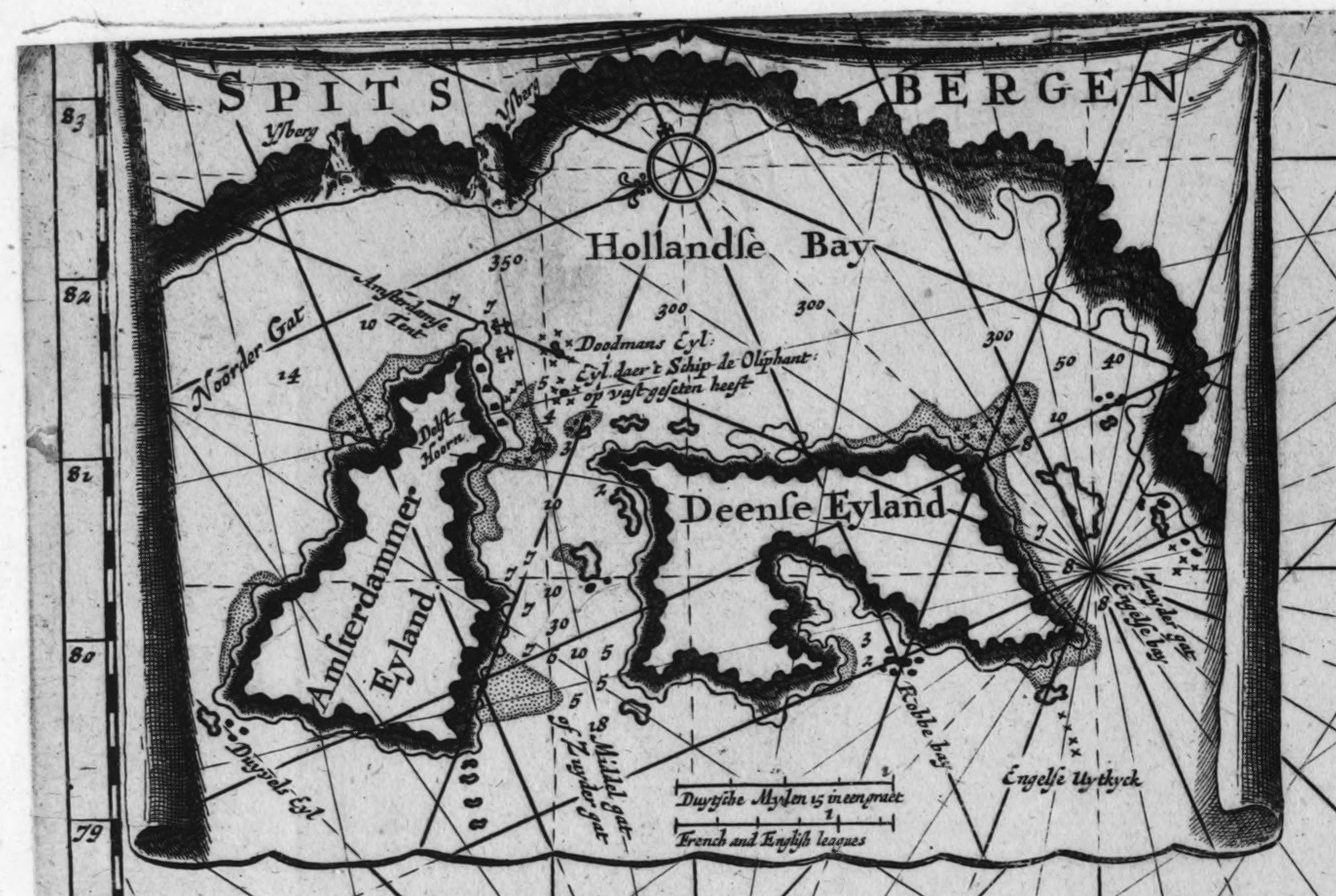
17th-century Dutch map of "Amsterdammer Eyland".

Amsterdam Island (Norwegian: Amsterdamøya) is a small island off the northwest coast of West-Spitsbergen. It is separated from Danes Island by the strait Danskegattet. Its total area is 16.8 km^{2}. Its highest point is Hiertabreen, at 472 meters above sea level. The percentage of the island covered in ice is 11.5%.

== History ==
Amsterdam Island was first seen by Willem Barents in 1596. The Dutch first occupied it in 1614 (the year in which it was probably named), building a temporary whaling station on the island's southeastern promontory. In 1619 a semi-permanent station was constructed. It came to be called Smeerenburg (Dutch for "Blubber Town"). The settlement went into decline in the 1640s, and was abandoned sometime before 1660.
