= Raudfjorden =

Fjord on the northwestern coast of Spitsbergen

Coordinates: 79°40′N 12°00′E

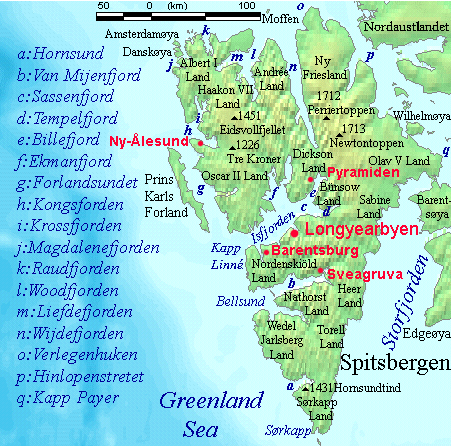
Raudfjorden (labelled k) is on the northwestern coast of Spitsbergen.

Raudfjorden (English: Red fjord) is a 20 km long and 5 km wide fjord on the northwestern coast of Spitsbergen. It has two southern branches, Klinckowströmfjorden and Ayerfjorden, split by the peninsula Buchananhalvøya. The fjord is situated on the divide between Albert I Land and Haakon VII Land.

== History ==
Raudfjorden was named Red-cliff Sound by Robert Fotherby, an English explorer and whaler, in 1614. The same year the Dutch named the fjord Monier Bay, after the commissary-general of their whaling fleet that year, Anthonie Monier. This latter name was first marked by the Dutch from 1620 onwards. The former name was later corrupted to Red Bay, the name the fjord retains to this day. The cape separating its two southern branches was named Point Deceit by Fotherby the same year he explored the fjord, which is now known by its Norwegian equivalent, Narreneset.
