= Smeerenburg =

17th-century whaling station in Svalbard, Norway

- Whaling station
- Location in northwestern Svalbard
- Coordinates: 79°43′54″N 10°59′42″E
- Country: Norway
- Syssel: Svalbard
- Island: Spitsbergen
- Settled: 1619
- Closure: 1657

Population
  - Total: 0
- Time zone: UTC+1 (CET)
  - Summer (DST): +2

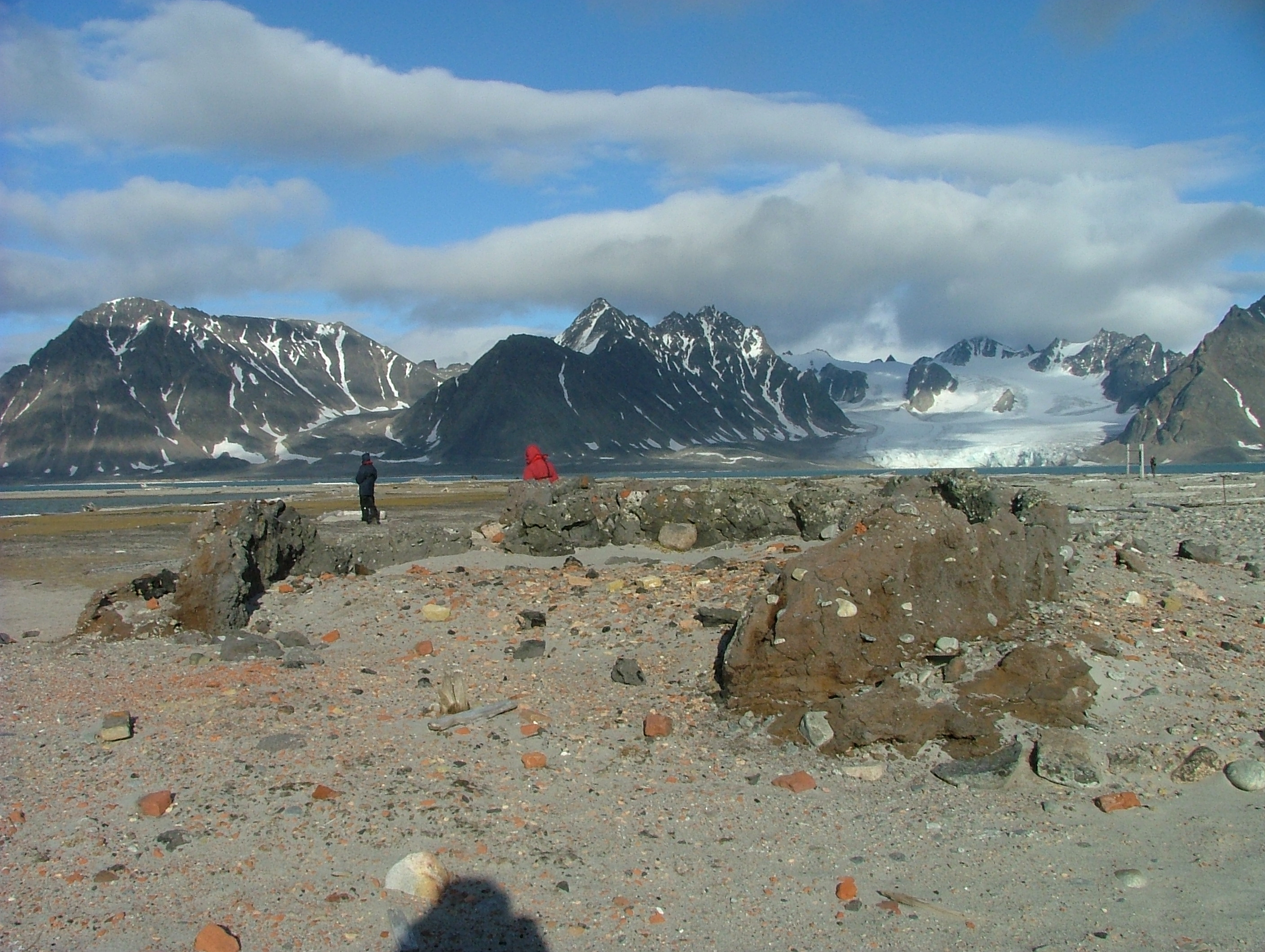
Remains of blubber ovens at Smeerenburg

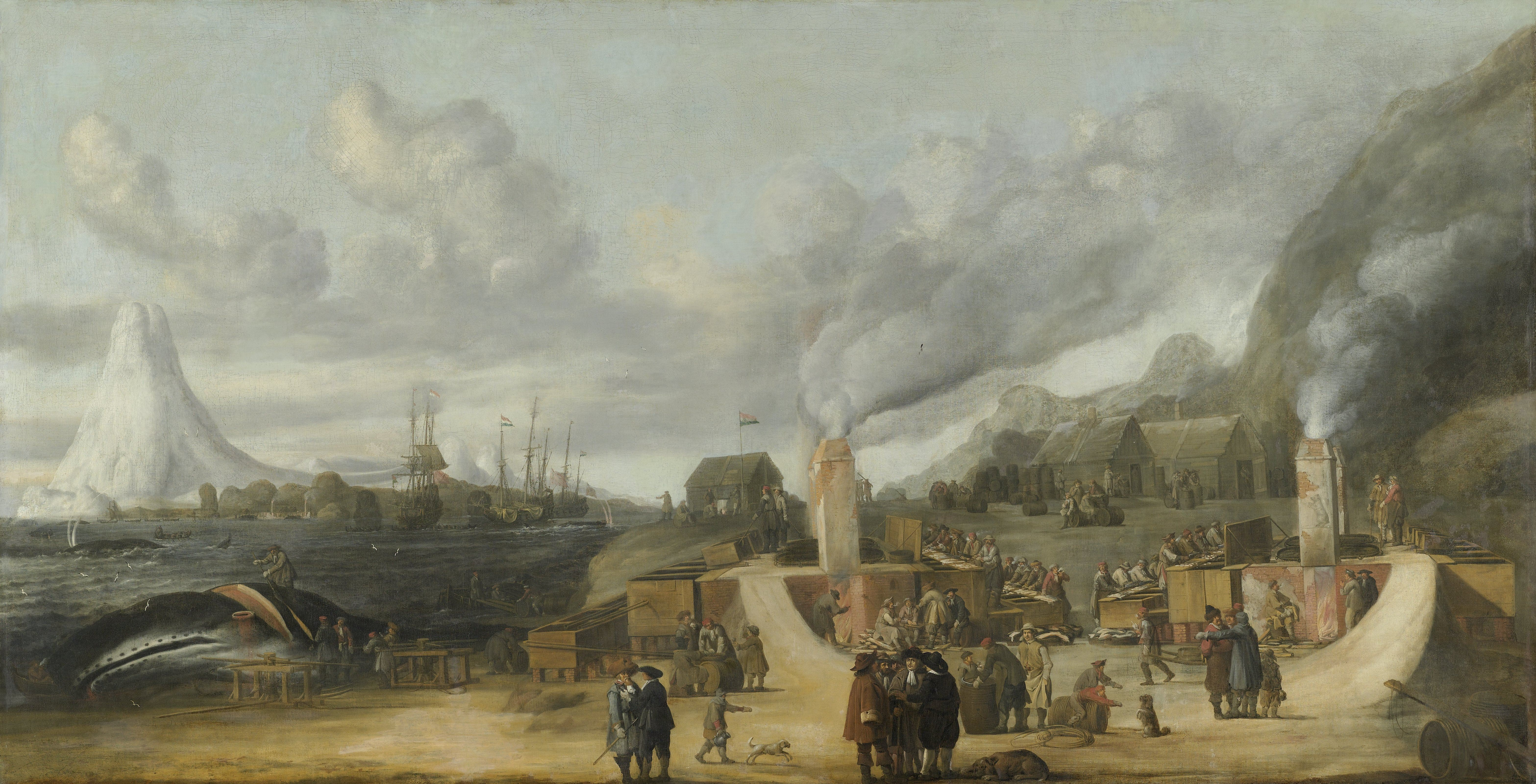
"The train oil cookery of the Amsterdam chamber of the Northern Company at Smeerenburg". Painting by Cornelis de Man (1639), based on a painting of a "Dansk hvalfangststation" (Danish whaling station) by ABR Speeck (1634).

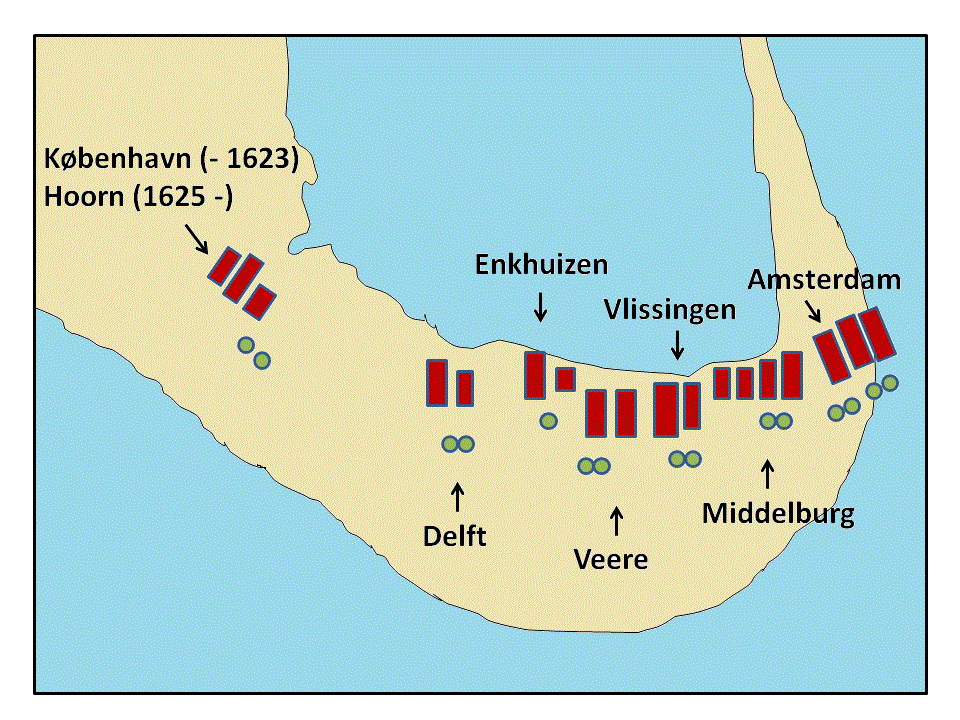
Map of the original Smeerenburg, with trade huts (red) and oil boilers (green). The names denote which city owned the relevant facilities.

Smeerenburg was a whaling station on Amsterdam Island in northwest Svalbard. It was founded by the Danish and Dutch in 1619 as one of Europe's northernmost outposts. With the local bowhead whale population soon decimated and whaling developed into a pelagic industry, Smeerenburg was abandoned around 1660.

== History ==
During the first intensive phase of the Spitsbergen whale fishery, Smeerenburg served as the centre of operations in the north. The name Smeerenburg is a Dutch word literally meaning "blubber town". The whalers were taking the "Greenland right whale", now known as the bowhead whale, which were then prevalent in Fram Strait. At that time, oil was rendered from whale blubber using try pots on shore, rather than on ships at sea, so the whalers needed a shore station for the try works. The image at right shows the concretised remnants of whale oil that built up around the large (ca. 2-3m diameter) copper kettles in which the blubber was rendered. Leftover blubber was used as fuel for the fires.

The site of Smeerenburg was first occupied by the Dutch in 1614, when ships from the Amsterdam chamber of the Noordsche Compagnie (Northern Company) established a temporary whaling station here with tents made of canvas and crude, temporary ovens. In 1615, 1616, and 1618 the Dutch again occupied the site. In 1619, a 500-ton ship with timber and other materials was sent to Spitsbergen. The tents and temporary ovens were replaced with wooden structures and copper kettles "set in a permanent fashion on a brick foundation, with a brick fireplace beneath and a chimney for the smoke."

In its first year only Amsterdam and the Danes occupied Smeerenburg, the former to the east and the latter to the west. In 1619 and 1620 the Danish ships that went to Smeerenburg were sent by merchants from Copenhagen, while those that went there in 1621 and 1622 were sent by a royal undertaking. In 1623 two Basque ships employed by the Danes arrived at Smeerenburg and began taking whaling gear from the Danish huts before they were driven away by the Dutch. In 1625, when the Danish-employed Basque ships arrived at their place in Smeerenburg they found that their station had been damaged, the work of the Dutch and English in the previous season. After 1625 the Danes were expelled by the Dutch, their place being occupied by the Hoorn, Enkhuizen, and Vlissingen chambers. By 1626 there were five big "huts" at Smeerenburg, and by 1633 all the chambers of the Northern Company were represented at the settlement.

In its heyday in the 1630s, Smeerenburg was made up of 16–17 buildings, including a fort at its centre, built in or before 1631 to ward off the Danish and other interlopers. The alleys between the buildings were cobbled with drainage gullies, allowing the men to walk dry-shod. There were seven double (and one single) ovens situated in front of the buildings. Amsterdam had three of the buildings and two of the double ovens, while to the west were the stations of the Middelburg, Veere, Vlissingen, Enkhuizen, Delft, and Hoorn chambers. During this time there were as many as 200 men working ashore, boiling blubber into oil, flensing whales, and coopering casks to pour the oil into.

Following the destruction of a Dutch station in Jan Mayen by Danish-employed Basque ships in 1632, the Dutch sent seven men, led by Jacob Segerszoon van der Brugge, to over-winter at Smeerenburg in 1633–34. All seven men survived, prompting another wintering by another group of seven sailors in 1634–35. All of them died, and the experiment was abandoned.

Smeerenburg's decline began in the early to mid-1640s, as whales became scarce in the bays and sounds off Spitsbergen. It was still in use by the Hoorn chamber as late as 1657. Around 1660, with the transition to processing blubber into oil on return to port and expansion into pelagic whaling, the settlement was finally abandoned.

In 1973 the ruins of Smeerenburg became part of Norway's North-West Spitsbergen National Park.

== Fact ==
The size of Smeerenburg has been greatly exaggerated by many authors. In 1820 William Scoresby claimed that 200 to 300 ships and 12,000 to 18,000 men visited Smeerenburg during the short summer season. The Norwegian explorer Fridtjof Nansen made similar claims in 1920, stating that hundreds of ships were anchored along the flat of Smeerenburg where ten thousand people visited a complete town with stalls and streets. Besides the tryworks, there were claims of smithies, workshops, shops, churches, fortifications, gambling dens and even brothels.

Such claims have no basis in reality, as noted above. No more than fifteen ships and 400 men would have visited Smeerenburg during its peak in the 1630s. There were no shops, churches or brothels, though there was a single fort with two guns. Despite the results of archaeological excavations that took place in the period 1979–81, modern authors still sometimes repeat the fabulous legends told of Smeerenburg.
