= Albert I Land =

Land area of Spitsbergen, Svalbard, Norway

Coordinates: 79°33′08″N 11°28′10″E

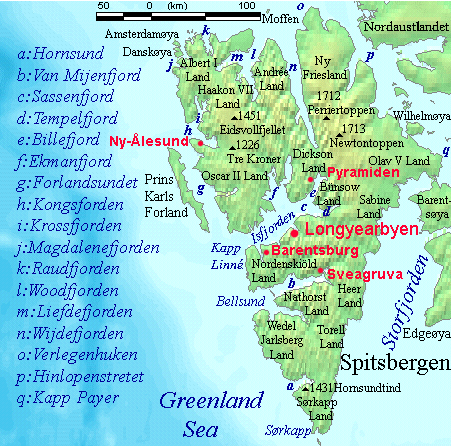
Albert I Land is located at the northwestern corner of Spitsbergen.

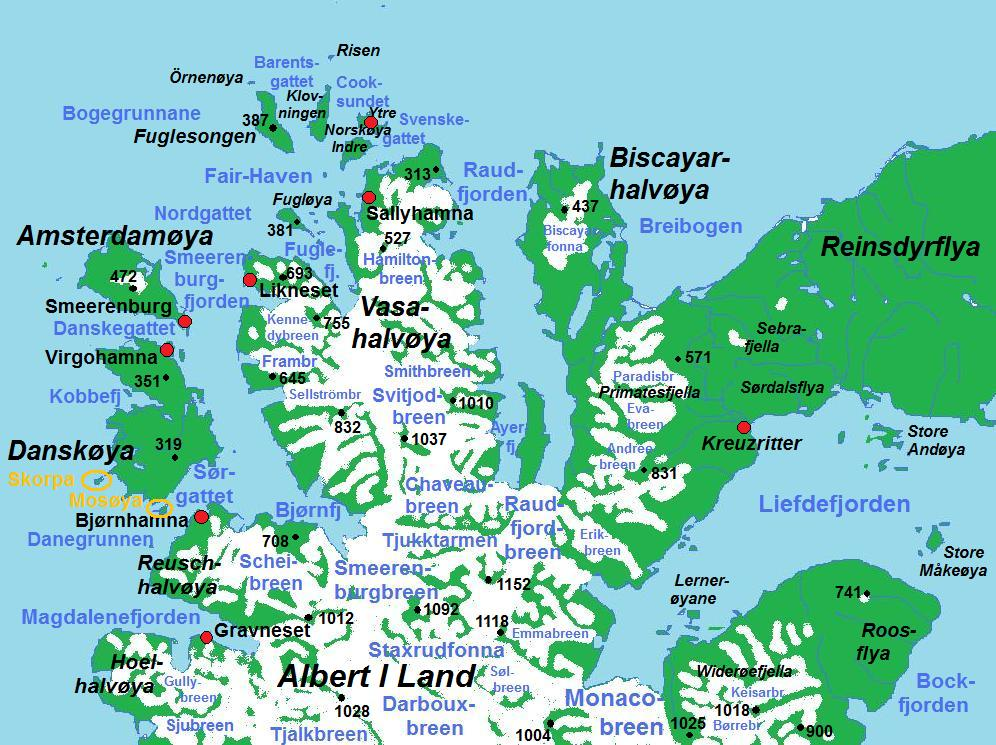
Northern part of Albert I Land

1598 map of the arctic by Willem Barentsz, showing Albert I Land

Albert I Land is the land area of the northwestern part of Spitsbergen, Svalbard. It is bordered by Haakon VII Land to the southeast. To the northeast lies Raudfjorden and its inner branch, Klinckowströmfjorden, to the southeast Krossfjorden and its inner branch, Lilliehöökfjorden, to the west and north the Arctic Ocean.

Albert I Land is part of Spitsbergen that was first observed by Willem Barentz in 1596. Currently uninhabited, several geographical names stem from the history of whaling in the area during the 17th century. The area is named after Albert I, Prince of Monaco, in honor of his exploration of Spitsbergen, and in particular this area in 1898-1907.

The Hornemantoppen mountain is the highest peak in Albert I Land.
