= Geography of Svalbard =

Svalbard
- Interactive map of Svalbard

Geography
- Location: Arctic Ocean
- Coordinates: 78°00′N 20°00′E
- Major islands: Spitsbergen, Nordaustlandet, Edgeøya
- Area: 64,029 km^{2} (24,722 sq mi)
- Coastline: 3,587 km (2228.9 mi)
- Highest elevation: 1,713 m (5620 ft)
- Highest point: Newtontoppen

Administration
- Norway
- Largest settlement: Longyearbyen (pop. 2060)

Demographics
- Population: 2600 (2007)
- Pop. density: 0.04/km^{2} (0.1/sq mi)

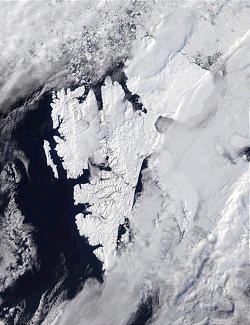
MODIS satellite photo of Svalbard, courtesy NASA

Svalbard is an archipelago in the Arctic Ocean roughly centered on 78° north latitude and 20° east longitude. It constitutes the northernmost territory of the Kingdom of Norway. The three main islands in the group consist of Spitsbergen (the largest island), Nordaustlandet and Edgeøya. There are also a number of smaller islands, such as Barents Island (Barentsøya) (1,288 km^{2} (497 sq mi)), Kvitøya (682 km^{2} (263 sq mi)), Prins Karls Forland (English: Prince Charles Foreland) (615 km^{2} (237 sq mi)), Kongsøya (191 km^{2} (74 sq mi)), Bear Island (178 km^{2} (69 sq mi)), Svenskøya (137 km^{2} (53 sq mi)), Wilhelm Island (120 km^{2} (46 sq mi)) and other smaller islands or skerries (621 km^{2} (240 sq mi)).

== Climate ==
There is no arable land in the island group due to heavy glaciation and the northern latitude. There are no trees native to the archipelago, but there are shrubs such as crowberry and cloudberry. The west coast of Spitsbergen remains navigable most of the year, due to favorable winds which keep the area ice-free. Norway claims a 200 nmi (370.4 km; 230.2 mi) fishery protection zone, but this is not recognized by neighboring Russia.

The climate of the Svalbard archipelago is arctic, tempered by warm North Atlantic Current along the west and northern coasts. This means cool summers and cold winters along the wild, rugged mountainous islands. The high land of the island interiors is generally ice covered year round, with the west coast clear of ice about one half of the year. There are many fjords along the west and north coasts.

== Resources ==
Svalbard has many mineral resources, and coal was mined extensively on the west side of Spitsbergen. Ice floes often block up the entrance to Bellsund (a transit point for coal exports) on the west coast and occasionally make parts of the northeastern coast inaccessible to maritime traffic

=== Environmental issues ===
Although many prior adverse practises are now banned, the issues surrounding past exploitation of animal resources in the Svalbard area remain a problem. With whale, seal and walrus populations are still far below than they were even two centuries ago (the average age of a Greenland whale). The population of polar bears are locally recovering from the major culls of the 1960s and 1970s that came about due to the availability of snow scooters; however, the polar bear remains threatened at a global level, due to unsustainable levels of killing by humans and marine water pollution. There are a wide variety of birds in Svalbard including puffin, Arctic skua, kittiwake and fulmar, many of which populations are being monitored.

== Physical geography ==
Svalbard, Bear Island & Jan Mayen

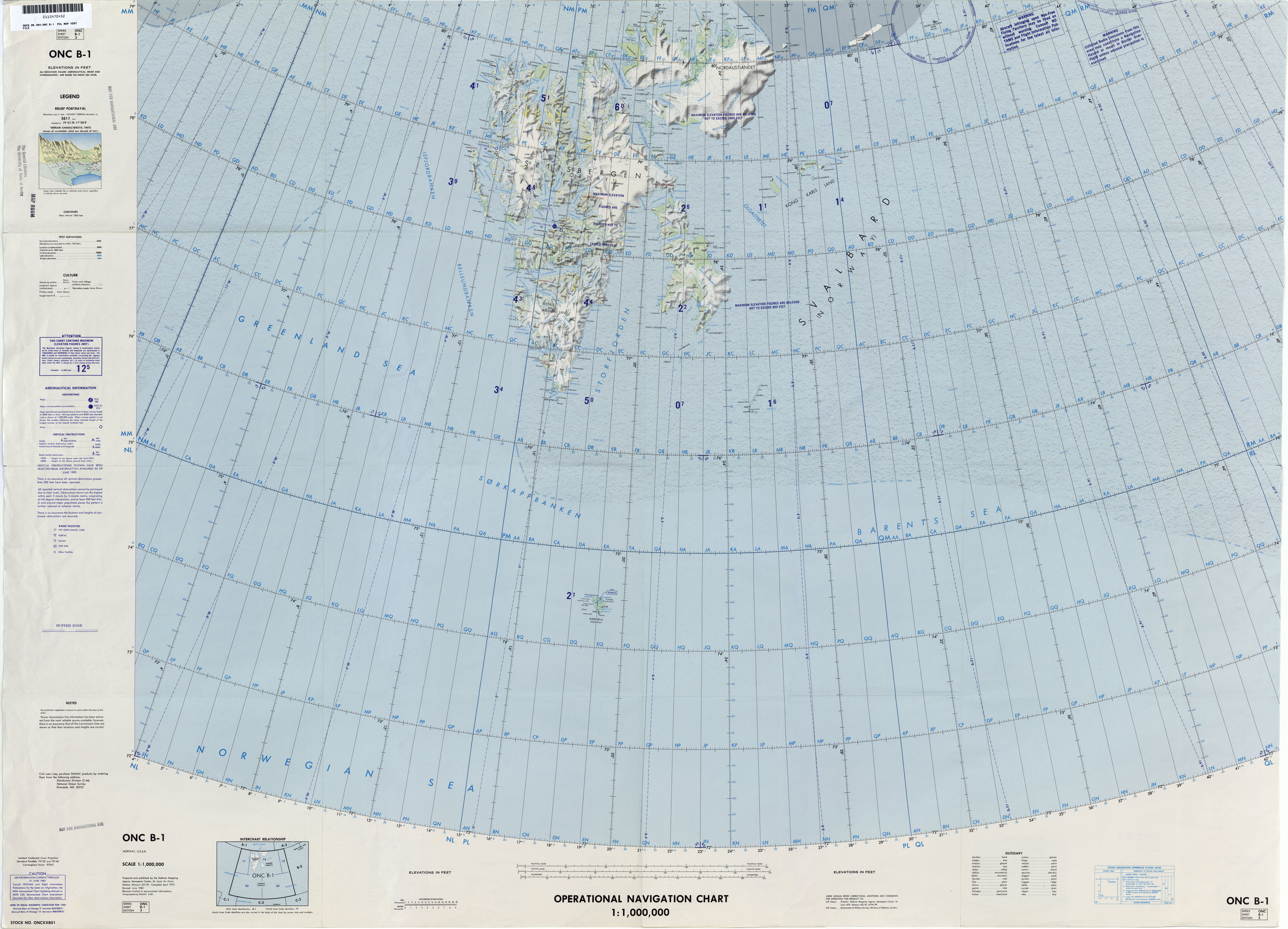
Svalbard (DMA; comp. 1973, rev. 1982)

=== Lands ===
The main islands of Svalbard are divided into several lands:

- Spitsbergen:
  - Albert I Land
  - Haakon VII Land
  - Andrée Land
  - Prins Karls Forland
  - Oscar II Land
  - James I Land
  - Dickson Land
  - Ny-Friesland
  - Olav V Land
  - Bünsow Land
  - Sabine Land
  - Nordenskiöld Land
  - Heer Land
  - Nathorst Land
  - Wedel Jarlsberg Land
  - Torell Land
  - Sørkapp Land
- Nordaustlandet
  - Gustav V Land
  - Prins Oscars Land
  - Orvin Land
  - Gustav Adolf Land

=== Fjords ===
There are numerous fjords among the Svalbard islands; the five longest of which (measured from the head to open sea) are listed here:

- Wijdefjorden, 108 km (67 mi)
- Isfjorden, 107 km (66 mi)
- Van Mijenfjorden, 83 km (52 mi)
- Woodfjorden, 64 km (40 mi)
- Wahlenbergfjord, 46 km (29 mi)

=== Coastlines ===
Largest islands
Island	Area (km^{2})	Area (sq mi)
Spitsbergen	37,673	14,546
Nordaustlandet	14,443	5,576
Edgeøya	5,074	1,959
Barentsøya	1,288	497
Kvitøya	682	263
Prins Karls Forland	615	237
Kongsøya	191	74
Bjørnøya	178	69
Svenskøya	137	53
Wilhelm Island	120	46
Others	621	240

Coastlines of the Svalbard islands (listed from largest island to smallest) show the extensive variability characteristic of glacial formation:

- Spitsbergen, 3,919 km (2,435 mi)
- Nordaustlandet, 1,688 km (1,049 mi)
- Edgeøya, 502 km (312 mi)
- Barentsøya, 205 km (127 mi)
- Kvitøya, 119 km (74 mi)
- Prins Karls Forland, 320 km (200 mi)
- Kongsøya, 132 km (82 mi)
- Bear Island (Bjørnøya), 88 km (55 mi)
- Hopen, >66 km (41 mi)
- Svenskøya, 62 km (39 mi)
- Wilhelm Island, 58 km (36 mi)
- Other smaller islands and skerries, 1,736 km (1,079 mi)

=== Mountains ===
Although they are small when compared with the mountains of Norway, the elevation of the Svalbard island mountains accounts for much of the glacial erosion:

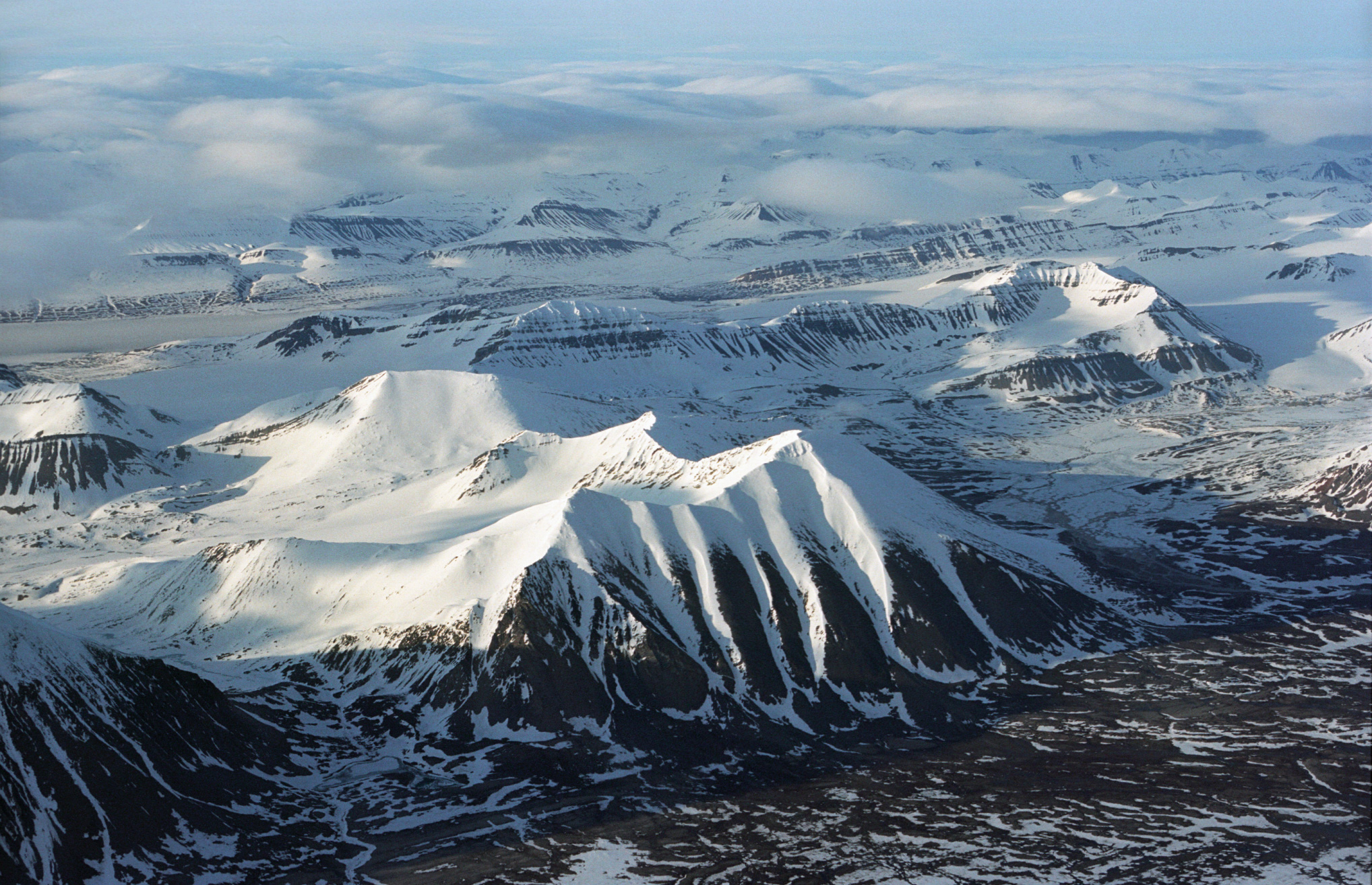
Mountains on Spitsbergen.

- Newtontoppen, 1,713 m (5,620 ft)
- Perriertoppen, 1,712 m (5,617 ft)
- Ceresfjellet, 1,675 m (5,495 ft)
- Chadwickryggen, 1,640 m (5,380 ft)
- Galileotoppen, 1,637 m (5,371 ft)

=== Glaciers ===
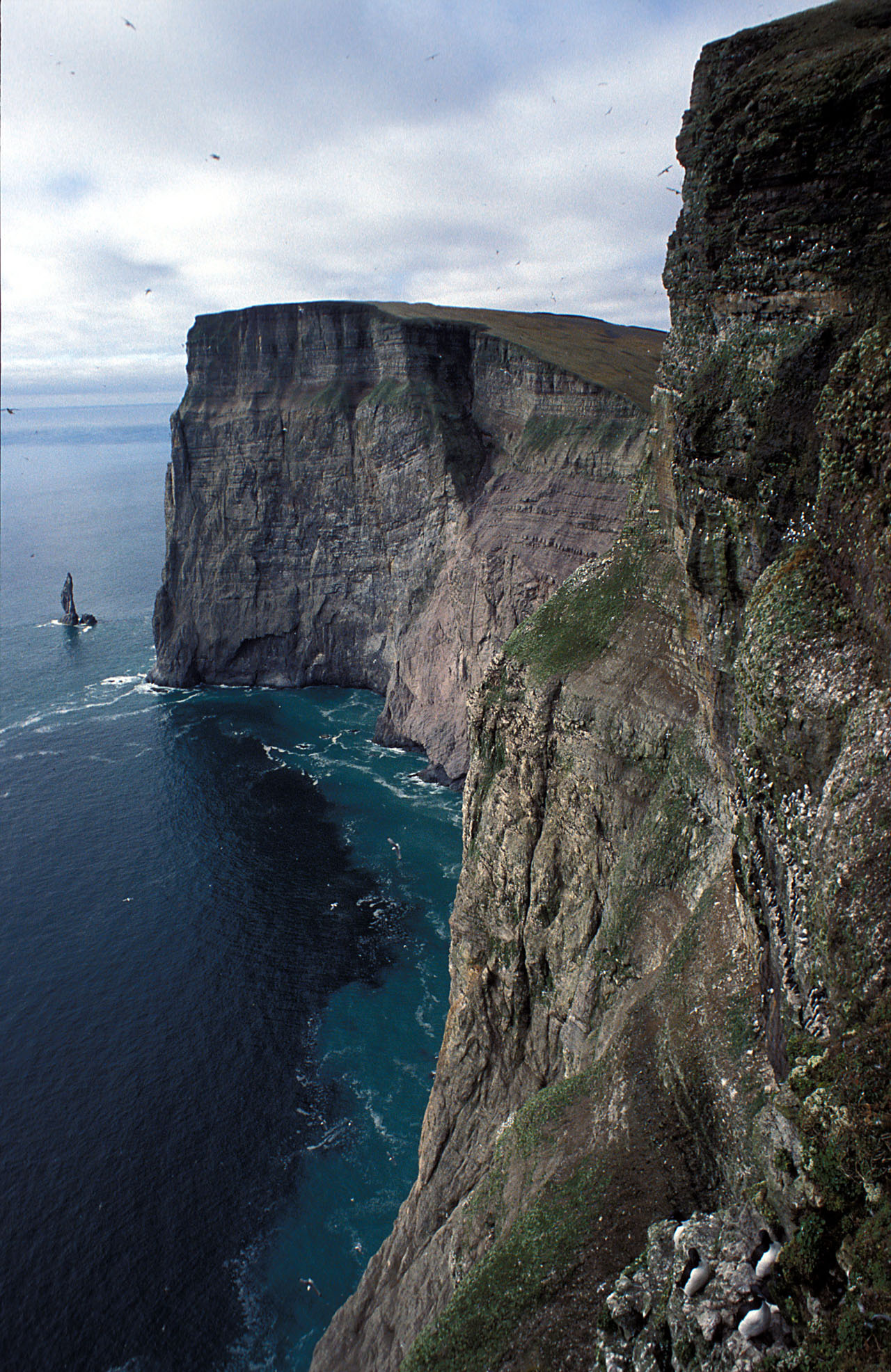
Stappen bird cliff at Bear Island.

- Austfonna (with Sørfonna and Vegafonna), 8,492 km^{2} (3,279 sq mi)
- Olav V Land, 4,150 km^{2} (1,600 sq mi)
- Vestfonna, 2,505 km^{2} (967 sq mi)
- Åsgårdfonna, 1,645 km^{2} (635 sq mi)
- Edgeøyjøkulen, 1,300 km^{2} (500 sq mi)
- Hinlopenbreen, 1,248 km^{2} (482 sq mi)
- Negribreen, 1,182 km^{2} (456 sq mi)
- Bråsvellbreen, 1,160 km^{2} (450 sq mi)
- Etonbreen, 1,070 km^{2} (410 sq mi)
- Leighbreen, 925 km^{2} (357 sq mi)
- Holtedahlfonna (with Isachsenfonna), 900 km^{2} (350 sq mi)
- Kvitøyjøkulen (Kvitøya (island)), 705 km^{2} (272 sq mi)
- Stonebreen, 700 km^{2} (270 sq mi)
- Kronebreen, 700 km^{2} (270 sq mi)
- Hochstetterbreen, 581 km^{2} (224 sq mi)
- Barentsjøkulen, 571 km^{2} (220 sq mi)
- Balderfonna, 543 km^{2} (210 sq mi)
- Nathorstbreen, 489 km^{2} (189 sq mi)
- Monacobreen, 408 km^{2} (158 sq mi)

=== Rivers ===
- Agardhelva
- Bungeelva
- Grøndalselva
- Lidelva
- Longyear River
- Reindalselva
- Sassenelva
- Semmeldalselva
- Slaklielva
- Vinda

== Settlements ==
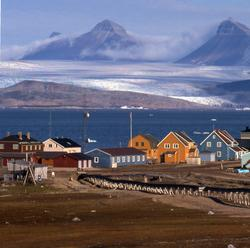
Ny-Ålesund in summer.

=== Inhabited ===
- Barentsburg (Баренцбург) (Russian settlement — population of 400)
- Bear Island (Norwegian weather station, population of 9)
- Hopen (Norwegian weather station, population of 4)
- Hornsund (Polish research station, population of 8)
- Longyearbyen (population of ≈2,000)
- Ny-Ålesund (population of 40)
- Sveagruva (population of 310, none living permanently)

No roads link the settlements on the island; transportation includes boat, airplane, helicopter, and snowmobile. The gateway to Svalbard is Svalbard Airport, Longyearbyen.

=== Former ===
- Harlingen kokerij (Dutch settlement established in 1636 in Houcker Bay, abandoned sometime after 1662)
- Kobbefjorden (also Robbe Bay or Copenhagen Bay) (Danish settlement established in 1631, abandoned in 1658)
- Engelskbukta (English settlement established around 1615, occupied until mid-century)
- Gravneset (English settlement established in the early 17th century, abandoned between 1624 and 1632, after which time it was appropriated by the Dutch)
- Grumant (Grumantbyen) (Грумант) (Russian settlement, abandoned in 1961, revival of mining operations announced in 2003)
- Gåshamna (Two English settlements, established sometime around 1618 and occupied until at least 1655)
- Lægerneset (Dutch settlement appropriated by the English in 1615, occupied by the latter until the 1650s)
- Port Louis (French settlement established in 1633, abandoned in 1637)
- Pyramiden (Пирамида) (Russian settlement, abandoned in 1998)
- Smeerenburg (Danish-Dutch settlement established in 1619 on the southeastern promontory of Amsterdam Island, abandoned around 1660)
- Ytre Norskøya (Dutch settlement possibly rivaling Smeerenburg in size; probably established by members of the Zeeland chamber in the 1620s or later, and abandoned in 1670)
