= Akademikarbreen =

Glacier in Svalbard, Norway

Coordinates: 78.73°N 18.40°E

Akademikarbreen (until 1995 spelled Akademikerbreen) is a glacier in Olav V Land at Spitsbergen, Svalbard. It covers an area of about 500 square kilometers and is located east of Backlundtoppen and Svanbergfjellet. The glacier extends from Billefjorden to the eastern coast, and borders to Lomonosovfonna, Negribreen and Kvitbreen. It is named after two members of Russian Academy of Science.
