= Chydeniusfjella =

Mountain group in Spitsbergen, Norway

Coordinates: 79°05′10″N 17°26′30″E

Chydeniusfjella is a mountain group in the Ny-Friesland region of Spitsbergen in the Svalbard archipelago. It is named after Finnish physicist Jakob Karl Emil Chydenius.

The mountain group is located between Wijdefjorden and Hinlopen Strait, and is surrounded by the glaciers of Ermakbreen, Harlandisen, Veteranen, Glasgowbreen and Kvitbreen. The group includes Newtontoppen, the highest peak in Svalbard at 1,713 metres.
