= Mittag-Lefflerbreen =

Coordinates: 78.8157°N 16.7068°E

Mittag-Lefflerbreen is a glacier at Spitsbergen, Svalbard in the Arctic Ocean. The glacier is located in Ny-Friesland, Dickson Land and Olav V Land, and debouches into Austfjorden. It is named after Swedish mathematician Gösta Mittag-Leffler. The lower, northern part of the glacier is included in the Indre Wijdefjorden National Park.
