= Einsteinvatnet =

- Location in Svalbard
- Location: Ny-Friesland at Spitsbergen, Svalbard
- Coordinates: 79.0487°N 16.3212°E
- Type: natural freshwater lake
- Basin countries: Norway

Einsteinvatnet is a lake in Ny-Friesland at Spitsbergen, Svalbard. It is located below the mountain Einsteinfjellet, east of Einsteinodden, at the eastern side of Austfjorden, an inner branch of Wijdefjorden. The lake is named after physicist Albert Einstein. The lake is included in the Indre Wijdefjorden National Park.
