= Longstaffbreen =

Glacier in Svalbard, Norway

Coordinates: 79.7722°N 16.1211°E

Longstaffbreen is a glacier in Ny-Friesland at Spitsbergen, Svalbard. It is a branch from the ice areas of Åsgardfonna and Valhallfonna, and the glacier debouches into the lake of Femmilsjøen. The glacier is named after Arctic explorer and mountaineer Tom George Longstaff.
