= Atomfjella =

Mountain range in Svalbard, Norway

Coordinates: 79.1479°N 16.6158°E

Atomfjella is a mountain range in Ny-Friesland at Spitsbergen, Svalbard, Norway. It is located between Austfjorden to the west and Planetfjella to the east, Smutsdalen and Smutsbreen to the south, and Reinsbukkdalen and Reinsbukkbreen to the north. Many of the mountains in Atomfjella have names from nuclear physics. The mountain range includes Perriertoppen, Nøytronfjellet, Elektronfjellet, Radiumfjellet, Curiefjellet, Rutherfordfjellet, Grøssfjellet, Einsteinfjellet, Bohrryggen and others.
