= Kapp Petermann =

Headland in Spitsbergen, Svalbard

Coordinates: 79°10.0′N 15°48.8′E

Map of the Indre Wijdefjorden National Park with Kapp Petermann located on the northern tip of Gråkammen (not marked).

Kapp Petermann (Cape Petermann) is the north point of the peninsula separating Austfjorden and Vestfjorden, northernmost in Dickson Land, Spitsbergen on Svalbard.

Named after August Petermann (1822–78), German geographer.
