= Vestfjorddalen (Svalbard) =

Valley of Spitsbergen, Norway

Geography of Vestfjorddalen (Svalbard)
- Coordinates: 79°02′52″N 15°36′56″E
- Terrain: Valley

Map of the Indre Wijdefjorden National Park with Vestfjorddalen to the west.

Vestfjorddalen (West Fjord Valley) is a glacial valley in the inner, western branch, Vestfjorden, of Wijdefjorden. Located in the west of the Indre Wijdefjorden National Park on the divide between Andrée Land and Dickson Land in Spitsbergen, Svalbard in Arctic Norway. It is 12 km long and forks into Universitetsbreen to the south and Lisbetbreen to the northeast.
