= Jean Vrolicq =

French whaler and privateer

Jean Vrolicq (also called Jacques, Johannes, Joanis, or Joan Vrolicq/Vrolyck) was a mariner from St-Jean-de-Luz in the first half of the 17th century. He served in the Danish, Dutch, and French whaling industries from 1619 to 1636, and later became a privateer.

== Voyages, 1619-37 ==
In 1619 he was among Basque whalemen recruited for a Danish whaling expedition to Spitsbergen. In the following years he continued to participate in the Danish whaling industry in one form or another. In 1624 Vrolicq served as a harpooner for the Dutch Noordsche Compagnie, and the following year he represented two Basque whaling merchants who sent ships to Spitsbergen for a Copenhagen company. In July 1629 Cardinal Richelieu gave Vrolicq a charter for whaling north of 60°. In 1631 Vrolicq was master of the ship Valk (140 tons), in which he sailed to Spitsbergen in partnership with the Hamburg merchant Johan Braem, who also sent a ship to the island. The Dutch tried to expel them from their anchorage in Københavns Bay (Kobbefjorden), but failed. The following year, 1632, he parted ways with Braem and sailed under the patronage of Cardinal Richelieu and the King of France. A company was formed in Le Havre and Vrolicq was put in command of three vessels, the St.-François (200 tons), under Pierre Harel, the Grâce (130 tons), under Martingo de Lagairalde, and the Notre Dame des Anges (100 tons), under Jacques Godefroy. When Vrolicq reached the northwest coast of Spitsbergen early in July he was promptly expelled by the admiral of the Dutch whaling fleet, Jacob Jansz Duynkercker. He fled to Iceland, where he obtained a paltry two whales, both found dead.

In 1633 Vrolicq sailed to Spitsbergen (or Terre-Verte, as the French called it) with a fleet of four vessels. Besides Lagairalde and Harel, who again commanded the Grâce and St. François, respectively, the fleet included the St. Jacques (200 tons), under Jean Herault, and the Espérance (250 tons), under Paul Languillet. Barred from Mauritius Bay (modern Smeerenburgfjorden) and Københavns Bay (Port-Saint-Pierre to the French) by the Dutch admiral Cornelis Ys, Vrolicq was forced to the south, where he found a tiny bay he named Refuge François or Port Louis (modern Hamburgbukta, lying just south of Magdalenefjorden). He returned to Port Louis in 1634, this time with a total of six vessels: Vrolicq in the Hardy, Harel and Languillet again in the St. François and Espérance, as well as Abraham Oulson in the Lion Rouge (250 tons), one Martin in the barque La Marie, and an unnamed sixth vessel. In June, only a few days after their arrival in Port Louis, two English men-of-war, under William Goodlad, tried to expel Vrolicq and his ships, but failed. They left Spitsbergen in September, with a total catch of eighteen bowhead whales.

In 1635 Vrolicq once more resorted to Port Louis, this time with a fleet of four vessels: the St. Jacques, under Vrolicq himself, the St. François, under Harel, the Lion Rouge, under Oulson, and an unnamed fourth vessel. The St. François was armed with 14 pieces of ordnance and the Lion Rouge with 10; both were to land four pieces at the mouth of Port Louis to prevent attack from Dutch and English vessels. The following year, 1636, Vrolicq left with five vessels. Vrolicq again sailed in the St. Jacques, Harel in the St. François, Oulson in the Lion Rouge, Baptiste Girard in the Avenir (120 tons), and an unnamed fifth vessel. Following a Spanish raid which resulted in the sacking of St-Jean-de-Luz, Ciboure, and Socoa and the capture of fourteen French Basque whaleships in 1636, Vrolicq devoted himself to privateering.

== Contributions to cartography ==
A map (c. 1634) of Spitsbergen entitled La France Artique has been attributed to Vrolicq. Among the features labelled are Baie des Holandois (Smeerenburgfjorden), Port St. Pierre (Kobbefjorden), Port-Louis or Refuge Français (Hamburgbukta, mentioned above), and Baie aux Anglois (Kongsfjorden). To the southwest of Spitsbergen lies Jan Mayen, which is labelled as Ysle de Richelieu. Vrolicq makes the obviously spurious claim of having discovered the island in 1612.
