= Backlundtoppen =

Mountain in Spitsbergen, Norway

- Location within Svalbard

Highest point
- Elevation: 1,068 m (3,504 ft)
- Coordinates: 78°43′05″N 18°13′09″E

Backlundtoppen is a mountain in Olav V Land at Spitsbergen, Svalbard. It has a height of 1,068 m.a.s.l. and is located east of Billefjorden and west of Akademikarbreen. The mountain is named after Swedish-Russian astronomer Johan Oskar Backlund. It hosted a trigonometric station during the Swedish-Russian Arc-of-Meridian Expedition.
