= Rutherfordfjellet =

Mountain in Ny-Friesland, Svalbard, Norway

Coordinates: 79.1593°N 16.3213°E

Rutherfordfjellet is a mountain in Ny-Friesland at Spitsbergen, Svalbard, Norway. It is located at the eastern side of Austfjorden. The mountain is named after physicist Ernest Rutherford. Rutherfordfjellet is part of the Atomfjella mountain range.
