= Lisbetbreen =

Tributary glacier in Spitsbergen, Svalbard in Arctic Norway

Coordinates: 79°4.1′N 15°1.8′E

Map of the Indre Wijdefjorden National Park with Lisbetbreen to the west.

Lisbetbreen (Lisbet Glacier) is a tributary glacier on the northwestern side of Universitetsbreen, on the divide between Andrée Land and James I Land in Spitsbergen, Svalbard in Arctic Norway. It is approx. 15 km long Z-shaped flowing in an easterly direction from Millarpasset in the northwest, turning southeast along Spissfjellet and finally east again at the concourse with Universitetsbreen into Vestfjorddalen.

Named after Elisabeth Cathrine Høeg, née Blom (1898–1927), wife of Ove Arbo Høeg, Norwegian botanist and palaeontologist, curator of the Museum of Trondheim, member of the Norwegian Svalbard Expedition 1924.
