= Austfjordnes =

Headland in Spitsbergen, Svalbard

Coordinates: 79.1262°N 16.1911°E

Austfjordnes is a headland located in Austfjorden, the inner eastern branch of Wijdefjorden, in Ny-Friesland at Spitsbergen, Svalbard. A cabin available for trappers is located at Austfjordnes.
