= Landingsdalen =

Valley of Spitsbergen, Norway

Coordinates: 79.1620°N 15.3949°E

Landingsdalen (Norwegian: The Landing Valley) is a valley in Andrée Land at Spitsbergen, Svalbard. It is located west of Vestfjorden, the western branch of Wijdefjorden.
