= Krosspynten =

Headland in Spitsbergen, Svalbard

Coordinates: 79.2071°N 15.7408°E

Krosspynten is a headland at the western side of Wijdefjorden in Andrée Land at Spitsbergen, Svalbard. The branch Vestfjorden mouths into Wijdefjorden at Krosspynten.

Krosspynten is included in the Indre Wijdefjorden National Park. A trapper's cabin which was built at Krosspynten in 1910 has been relocated to a museum in Tromsø.
