= Woodfjorddalen =

Valley of Spitsbergen, Norway

Coordinates: 79.229°N 14.208°E

Woodfjorddalen is a valley in Andrée Land at Spitsbergen, Svalbard. It forms a southeastward continuation of the fjord Woodfjorden. The upper part of the valley is covered by the glacier Abrahamsenbreen. At the lower part of the valley is the flat sand and clay area Poninskiøyra and the hill Tantalushaugen. A side valley to the south is Piræusdalen, six kilometers from the head of Woodfjorden. North of the valley is the mountain group Vaktarfjella, with a length of about eleven kilometers.
