= Høegdalen =

Valley of Spitsbergen, Norway

Coordinates: 79.003°N 15.932°E

Høegdalen is a valley in Dickson Land at Spitsbergen, Svalbard. It is named after Norwegian botanist Ove Arbo Høeg. It is located west of Austfjorden. The river of Høegelva flows through the valley, originating from the glacier of Høegdalsbreen and ending in Austfjorden.
