= Høegelva =

River of Spitsbergen, Norway

Coordinates: 79°00′21″N 16°02′24″E

Høegelva is a river in Dickson Land at Spitsbergen, Svalbard. It is named after Norwegian botanist Ove Arbo Høeg. The river has a length of about nine kilometers, originating from the glacier of Høegdalsbreen, flowing through the valley of Høegdalen, and ending into Austfjorden.
