= Torsfonna =

Glacier in Svalbard, Norway

Coordinates: 79°30.2′N 18°16.7′E

Torsfonna is glacier at Spitsbergen, Svalbard. It is located on Lomfjordhalvøya at Ny-Friesland. It is named after the Norse god Thor. A former name of the glacier was Névé dôme Tor. Further south, between Hinlopen Strait and Lomfjorden, is the glacier Balderfonna.
