= Femmilsjøen =

Lake at Spitsbergen, Svalbard

Coordinates: 79.7879°N 15.8503°E

- Location in Svalbard
- Location: Svalbard
- Type: natural freshwater lake
- Catchment area: 304.4 km^{2} (117.5 sq mi)
- Basin countries: Norway
- Max. length: 7.6 km (4.7 mi)
- Max. width: 1.3 km (0.81 mi)
- Surface area: 7.56 km^{2} (2.92 sq mi)
- Max. depth: 110 m (360 ft)
- Surface elevation: 26 m (85 ft)
- Frozen: part of year; a glacier permanently covers its eastern end

Femmilsjøen is a lake in Ny-Friesland at Spitsbergen, Svalbard. The glacier Longstaffbreen debouches into the lake at the eastern end. The western end of the lake is relatively close to Wijdefjorden.
