= Svanbergfjellet =

Mountain

Coordinates: 78.682°N 18.184°E

Svanbergfjellet is a mountain in Olav V Land at Spitsbergen, Svalbard. It has a height of 1,024 m.a.s.l. and is located east of Billefjorden and west of Akademikarbreen. The mountain is named after Swedish astronomer Jöns Svanberg. A point on the mountain was used as a trigonometric point during the Swedish-Russian Arc-of-Meridian Expedition.
