= Lomonosovfonna =

Ice cap on Svalbard, Norway

Coordinates: 78°44′54″N 17°35′12″E

Lomonosovfonna is an ice cap at Spitsbergen, Svalbard. The glacier is located northeast of the fjord Billefjorden. It covers an area of about 600 square kilometers, and divides Ny-Friesland from Olav V Land. It is named after Russian scientist Mikhail Lomonosov.
