= William Goodlad =

William Goodlad (c. 1576–1639) was a 17th-century English whaler. He was admiral of the Muscovy Company's London whaling fleet for nearly two decades, participating in several of the disputes involving the right to catch whales in Spitsbergen. The Arctic explorer Luke Foxe, in writing about the early voyages to Spitsbergen, said of him: "... but this I leave to Capt. Goodlade [sic], whose great experience this way, and to the E.-ward thereof, is the best able to supply or confute, if he be pleased so to shew himselfe".

== Career ==
Goodlad first appears as admiral of the English whaling fleet in 1620 in Thomas Edge's Dutch, Spanish, Danish Disturbance (1622), which appears in Samuel Purchas' Hakluytus posthumus or Purchas His Pilgrimes (1625). Edge states he was again admiral in 1621 and 1622. Purchas (1625) also reprints a letter, dated 8 July 1623 (Old Style), written by "Captaine William Goodlard [sic]" to vice-admiral William Heley. Writing from "Bell-sound" (Bellsund), the main harbor of the English in Spitsbergen, he reported a catch of "three and thirtie" whales there, as well as the lamentable loss of his brother Peter on 28 June (OS), who was drowned when pulled out of a boat by a kink in the line from a harpooned whale.

In 1626 the London fleet clashed with ships sent from Hull. Early in June the fleet reached Spitsbergen. Goodlad, aboard the warship Hercules, the 22-gunned flagship of the fleet, spent his time close to the ice in Bellsund, probably to protect nearby vessels. Near the end of the month he sailed to the harbor at "Whale Head", where he found several vessels from Hull, which "had killed some whales there and boyled them", despite the Muscovy Company's monopoly over the trade. They had also "taken away 8 shallops, burned the caske, broke the coolers, and spoyled all the other materialls fitt for the said fishing, to the overthrow of the voyage, and had demolished the houses and broken downe the fort and Plattforme built the yeare before for defense of the said harbor". Goodlad made his way to a "harbour neere adjoining" ("Bottle Cove", modern Midterhukhamna, at the entrance of Van Keulenfjorden), where he met nine ships of Hull and York, under the command of Richard Prestwood and Richard Perkins, admiral and rear admiral, respectively. After being refused satisfaction, a two-hour skirmish ensued, resulting in the defeat and expulsion of the Hull and York fleet. They were forced to leave Spitsbergen mid-way through season with only 162 tons of oil and 200 tons of blubber, about a "thirde parte of their ladeinge".

Goodlad is next mentioned in Edward Pellham's God's Power and Providence (1631), an account of the first successful (albeit unplanned) wintering in Spitsbergen in 1630–31. Pellham, in the ship Salutation, was "appointed by the order of our Captaine, Captaine William Goodler [sic], to stay at the Foreland, untill the fifteen of July". They were ordered away from the Foreland early in August, as the "captaine [had] made a great voyage at Bell Sownd", and needed them to take on some of the surplus oil. On the way there, Pellham and seven other men were sent ashore to obtain venison. On finding their ship absent from their rendezvous at "Green-harbour" (Grønfjorden), they made their way to Bellsund, where they spent the winter huddled in one of the huts of the Company's stations there. They were discovered there on 25 May 1631 (OS) by two ships of Hull; by 28 May (OS) the London fleet had arrived. Pellham describes his encounter with Goodlad as follows:

"A-board the Admirall we went, unto the right noble Captaine William Goodler [sic], who is worthy to be honoured by all Sea-men for his courtesie and bounty. This is the Gentleman that is every yeare chiefe Commander of this Fleete; and right worthy he is so to be, being a very wise man, and an expert Mariner as most be in England, none dispraised. Unto this Gentleman right welcome we were, and joyfully by him received; hee giving order that we should have any thing that was in the Ship that might doe us good and increase our strength; of his owne charges giving us apparell also, to the value of twenty pounds worth. Thus, after fourteene dayes of refreshment, wee grew perfectly well all of us..."

In 1634 Goodlad dealt not only with English interlopers, but with foreign ones as well. In June he arrived at "Port Louis" (modern Hamburgbukta, just south of Magdalenefjorden) with two men-of-war, where he encountered a fleet of six French ships under the command of Jean Vrolicq. He attempted to expel them from their harbor, but failed. Early in July he was given word that two ships from Yarmouth, the Mayflower and the James, under William Cave (or Cane) and Thomas Wilkinson, had taken up residence in Hornsund. Due to the ice he wasn’t able to reach Hornsund until about the last day of July. He demanded the Yarmouth ships depart at once, but they refused, allegedly boasting they "would maintain the harbour with their blood". In the skirmish that followed one of the Yarmouth men, Richard Colledg, was killed. Colledg's brother, Thomas, procured a warrant and had Goodlad arrested for his brother's death. Goodlad was eventually freed, whereas Thomas Colledg was sent to the Fleet Prison.

== Death ==
Goodlad died on 13 January 1639 and was buried in the churchyard in Leigh-on-Sea, Essex, England. The inscription on his vault read:

"Here lyeth expecting ye second coming of his Saviour, Capr. WILLIAM GOODLAD, Chiefe Commander of the Greenland Fleet XX yeares, and Maister of the Trinity House in anno 1638. He departed this life the 13 day of January 1639, in the LXII yeare of his age."
