= Galileotoppen =

Mountain in Norway

- Location within Svalbard

Highest point
- Elevation: 1,637 m (5,371 ft)
- Coordinates: 79°2.0′N 17°19.1′E

Geography
- Location: Spitsbergen, Svalbard, Norway

Galileotoppen is a mountain on Spitsbergen in Svalbard, Norway. At 1,637 metres (5,371 ft) tall, it is the fifth-tallest peak on Svalbard. It is located west of Wijdefjorden northwest of Newtontoppen in the south of Ny-Friesland. It is named for the Italian astronomer Galileo Galilei (1564–1642).
