= Sjettebreen =

Glacier in Svalbard, Norway

Coordinates: 79.4507°N 11.1184°E

Sjettebreen is a glacier in Albert I Land at Spitsbergen, Svalbard. It is located south of the peninsula Hoelhalvøya. The glacier debouches into the sea at the west coast of Spitsbergen. It is named as the sixth out of seven glaciers ending into the sea at the coast between Krossfjorden and Magdalenefjorden, counting from south.
