= Poninskiøyra =

Coordinates: 79.2349°N 14.0743°E

Poninskiøyra is a flat sand and clay area in Woodfjorddalen in Andrée Land and Haakon VII Land at Spitsbergen, Svalbard. It is located at the lower part of the valley, and includes the hill Tantalushaugen. The area is named after military officer and cartographer Bernhard Graf von Poninski, who made stereophotogrammetrical mapping of the Woodfjorden area during an expedition in 1907.
