= Lomfjordhalvøya =

Peninsula in Svalbard, Norway

Coordinates: 79.49°N 18.39°E

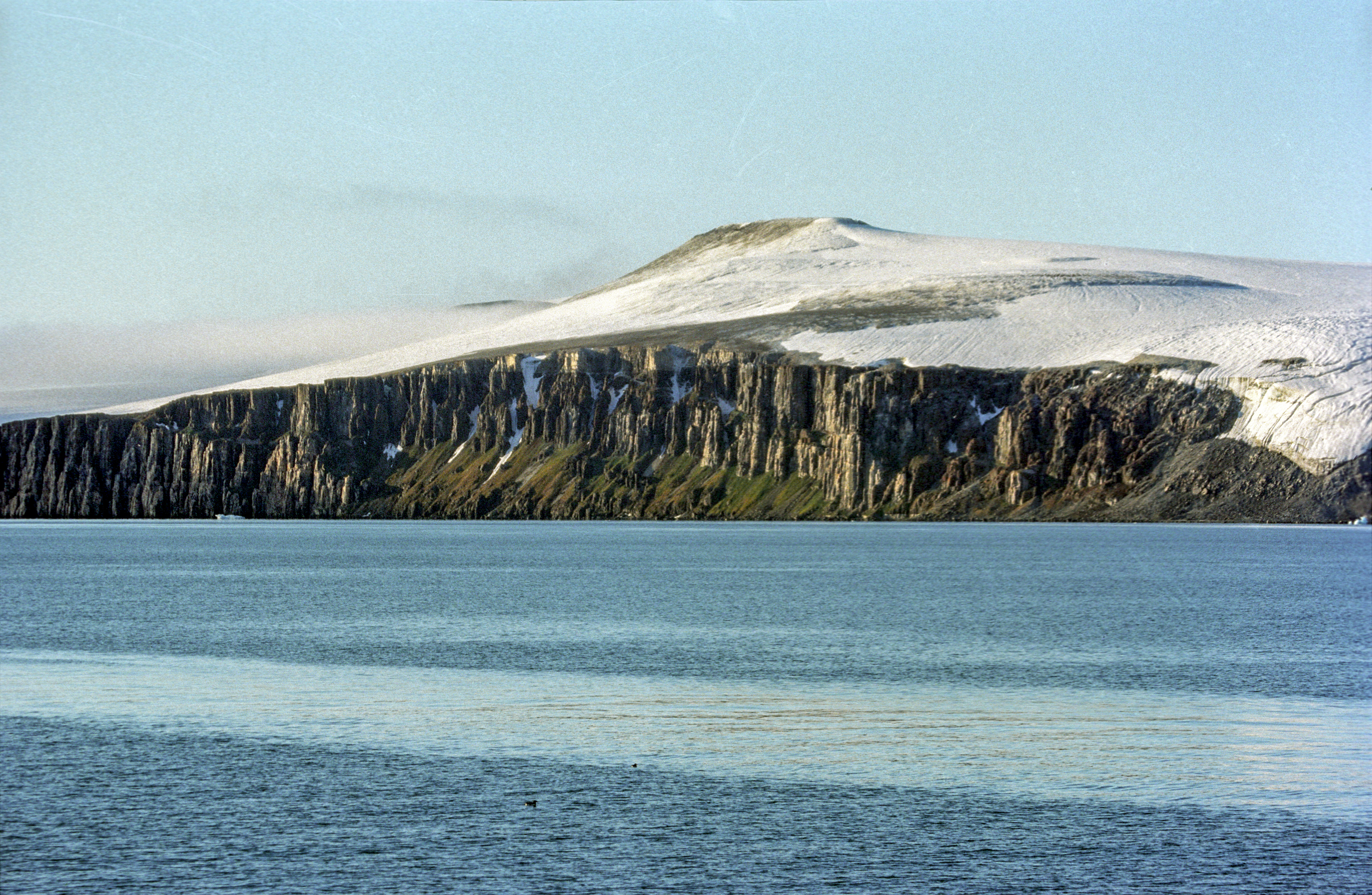
Kapp Fanshawe, the northern tip of Lomfjordhalvøya

Lomfjordhalvøya is a peninsula at the northeastern part of Ny-Friesland on Spitsbergen, Svalbard. It is 44 kilometers long, and 24 kilometers wide at its base. It is located between Lomfjorden and Hinlopen Strait. Its northern tip is Kapp Fanshawe. Former names of the peninsula include Terre Margareta and Margaretas Land. The peninsula is covered by two glaciers, Balderfonna and Torsfonna. It also includes the large nesting cliffs of Lovénberget.

The peninsula falls within the Nordaust-Svalbard Nature Reserve.
