= Vestfjorden (disambiguation) =

Vestfjorden is a large firth between the Lofoten islands and the mainland of Nordland county in Norway.

Vestfjorden (which means west fjord) may also refer to several other fjords in Norway:

- Vestfjorden (Buskerud), a fjord in Røyken, Buskerud county
- Vestfjorden (Finnmark), a fjord in Nordkapp, Finnmark county
- Vestfjorden (Svalbard), a fjord on the island of Spitsbergen in Svalbard
- Vestfjorden (Vestfold), a fjord in Stokke, Vestfold county
- Vestfjord (Greenland), a fjord in Greenland

== See also ==
- Westfjords
