= Gullybreen =

Glacier in Svalbard, Norway

Coordinates: 79.5347°N 10.9717°E

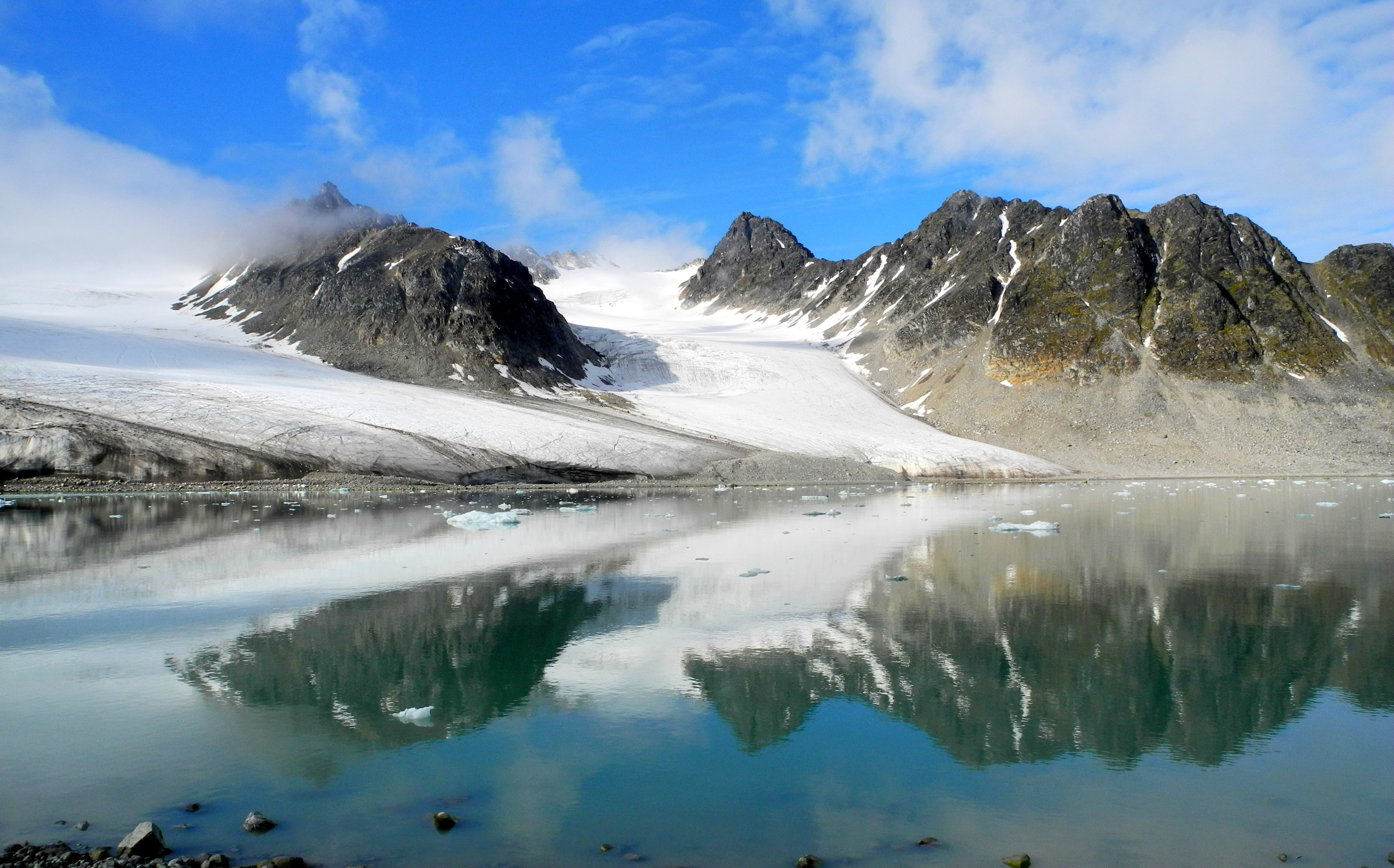
Gullybreen is debouching into Gullybukta.

Gullybreen is a glacier in Albert I Land at Spitsbergen, Svalbard. It is located in the peninsula Hoelhalvøya, south of Magdalenefjorden. The glacier debouches into Gullybukta, a southern bay of Magdalenefjoirden.
