= Chadwickryggen =

Mountain in Spitsbergen, Norway

- Location within Svalbard

Highest point
- Elevation: 1,640 m (5,380 ft)
- Coordinates: 79°5.7′N 16°46.9′E

Geography
- Location: Spitsbergen, Svalbard, Norway

Chadwickryggen is a mountain on Spitsbergen in Svalbard, Norway. At 1,640 metres (5,380 ft) high, it is the fourth-largest peak on Svalbard. It is located west of Wijdefjorden between Smutsbreen and Tryggvebreen in Ny-Friesland. It is named for the English physicist James Chadwick (1891–1974).
