= Valhallfonna =

Ice cap in Svalbard, Norway

Coordinates: 79.6696°N 17.2587°E

Valhallfonna is an ice cap in Ny-Friesland at Spitsbergen, Svalbard. It is located west of Hinlopen Strait and northeast of Åsgardfonna. The glacier covers an area of about 1,000 km^{2}.

== See also ==
- List of glaciers in Svalbard
- Valhallfonna Formation
