= Abrahamsenbreen =

Glacier at Spitsbergen, Norway

Coordinates: 79.1047°N 14.3912°E

Abrahamsenbreen is a glacier in Andrée Land at Spitsbergen, Svalbard. It has a length of fourteen kilometers, and is located in the inner part of Woodfjorddalen, branching off from Holtedahlfonna. The glacier is named after polar explorer Edvard Abrahamsen.
