= Einsteinfjellet =

Mountain in Spitsbergen, Norway

Coordinates: 79.0662°N 16.4652°E

Einsteinfjellet is a mountain in Ny-Friesland at Spitsbergen, Svalbard, Norway. It has a height of 1,547 m.a.s.l., and is located at the eastern side of Austfjorden. The mountain is named after physicist Albert Einstein. Einsteinfjellet is part of the Atomfjella mountain range.
