= Nordenskiöldbreen =

Glacier in Svalbard, Norway

Nordenskjold Glacier
- Nordensjoldbreen
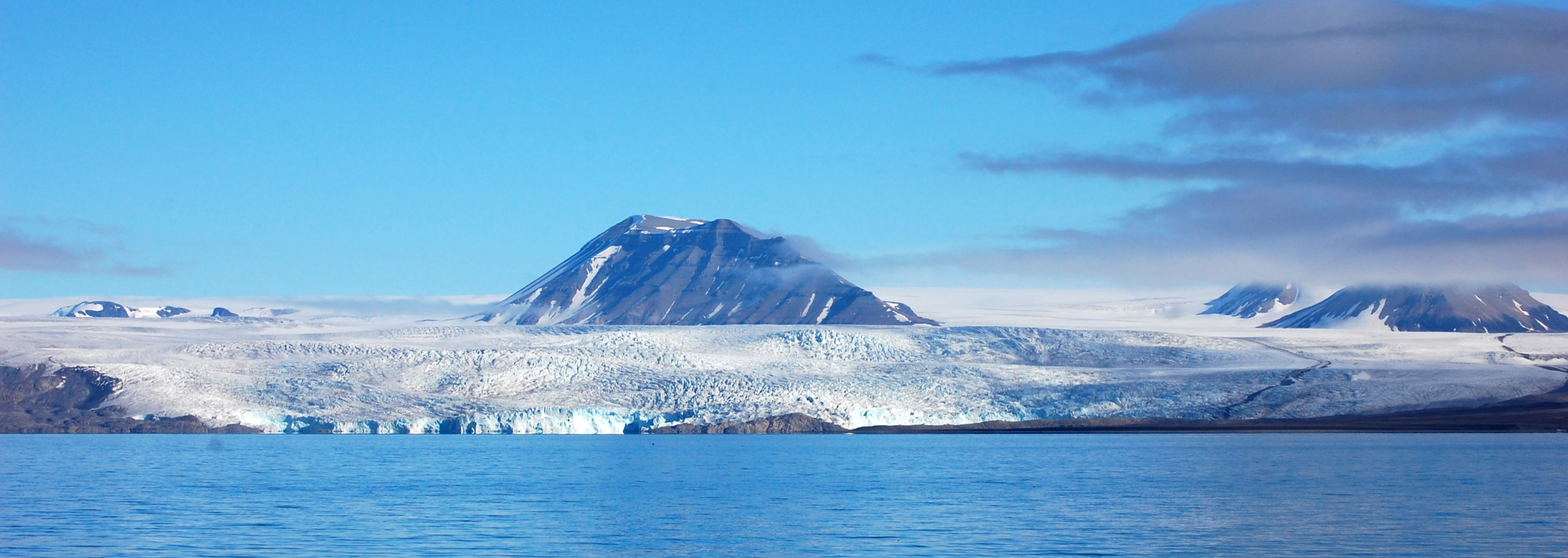
- The glacier seen from Billefjorden

- Location within Svalbard
- Location: Spitsbergen, Svalbard
- Coordinates: 78°40′N 17°10′E
- Length: 25 km (16 mi)
- Width: 11 km (6.8 mi)
- Terminus: Billefjorden, Arctic Ocean

Nordenskiöldbreen (Nordenskiöld Glacier) is a glacier in Spitsbergen, Svalbard. It is named after Finnish geologist Adolf Erik Nordenskiöld (1832–1901).

== Geography ==
Nordenskiöldbreen is located between Dickson Land and Bünsow Land. The glacier flows roughly southwestwards and is 25 km (16 mi) long and 11 km (6.8 mi) wide. It has its terminus in Adolfsbukta, a branch of Billefjorden.

== See also ==
- List of glaciers
