= Veteranen =

Glacier in Svalbard

Geography of Alta Landslide
- Coordinates: 79°16′56″N 17°16′22″E
- Terrain: Glacier

Veteranen (The Veteran) is a glacier in Ny-Friesland at Spitsbergen, Svalbard. It has a length of about 25 kilometers and a width of up to five kilometers. The glacier debouches into Lomfjorden, and is connected with Kvitbreen at the other side of Trebrepasset. The name of the glacier was suggested by Adolf Erik Nordenskiöld in 1863.
