= Vaktarfjella =

Coordinates: 79.2585°N 14.3491°E

Vaktarfjella is a mountain group in Andrée Land at Spitsbergen, Svalbard. It has an extension of about eleven kilometers, and is located north of the valley Woodfjorddalen. The highest summit in the group is Vaktaren, with a height of 1,227 m.a.s.l. The northwestern mountain in the group is Kapp Ringertz.
