= Oskar Backlund =

Swedish-Russian astronomer (1846–1916)

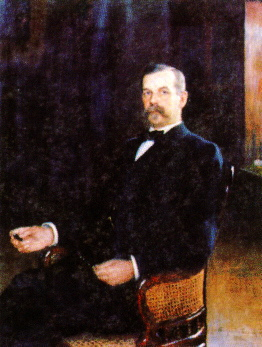
Oskar Backlund in 1900

Johan Oskar Backlund (28 April 1846 – 29 August 1916) was a Swedish-Russian astronomer. His name is sometimes given as Jöns Oskar Backlund, however even contemporary Swedish sources give "Johan". In Russia, where he spent his entire career, he is known as Oskar Andreevich Baklund (Russian: Оскар Андреевич Баклунд). Russian sources sometimes give his dates of birth and death as 16 April 1846 and 16 August 1916, since Russia still used the Julian calendar at the time.

== Life ==
He was born in Länghem, in Västergötland, Sweden and graduated from Uppsala University in 1872. After getting his doctorate in 1875, he emigrated to Russia in 1876. He worked at Dorpat Observatory, in today's Tartu, Estonia, and then in 1879 worked at Pulkovo Observatory, becoming director of the observatory from 1895 until his death.

He specialized in celestial mechanics, and notably worked on calculating the orbit of Comet Encke, taking into account the perturbations of various planets. He used observations of Comet Encke to try estimate the mass of Mercury. Russian sources sometimes referred to the comet as Comet Encke-Backlund. He also carried out geodesic studies in Spitzbergen from 1898 to 1900. He became a member of the Saint Petersburg Academy of Sciences in 1883, member of the Royal Swedish Academy of Sciences in 1897 and Fellow of the Royal Society in 1911. He was elected a Foreign Honorary Member of the American Academy of Arts and Sciences in 1914.

== Family ==
He was married to Ulrika Catharina Widebeck. Their daughter Elsa Celsing became a well-known artist, and their son Helge Gotrik Backlund (3 September 1878–1958) was a geologist and explorer.

== Honors ==
Awards

- Gold Medal of the Royal Astronomical Society (1909)
- Bruce Medal (1914)

Named after him

- The crater Backlund on the Moon
- Asteroid 856 Backlunda
- Backlundtoppen, a mountain in Olav V Land at Spitsbergen, Svalbard.
