= Balderfonna =

Glacier

Coordinates: 79°20′N 18°00′E

Balderfonna is a glacier in Spitsbergen, Svalbard. It is located on Ny-Friesland, between Hinlopen Strait and Lomfjorden. It is named after the Norse god Balder. Former names of the glacier include Lovén Plateau and Névé dôme Balder. Further north on Lomfjordhalvøya is Torsfonna.
