= Hoelhalvøya =

Peninsula in Svalbard, Norway

Coordinates: 79.5249°N 10.9566°E

Hoelhalvøya is a peninsula in Albert I Land at Spitsbergen, Svalbard. The peninsula is named after Arctic explorer Adolf Hoel. It is located south of Magdalenefjorden. Among the glaciers of the peninsula is Gullybreen, which debouches into Gullybukta, a southern bay of Magdalenefjoirden. East and south of the peninsula is a glacier system, where Sjettebreen debouches into the sea at the west coast, while Waggonwaybreen debouches into Magdalenefjorden to the north.
