= Purpurdalen =

Valley of Spitsbergen, Norway

Coordinates: 79.3398°N 15.3042°E

Purpurdalen is a valley in Andrée Land at Spitsbergen, Svalbard. It is located west of Wijdefjorden. The valley is named after the colour of Devonian rocks of the surrounding mountains. The braided river Purpurelva flows through the valley. Trappers built a cabin in Purpurdalen in the 1910s.
