= Arbobreen =

Glacier in Svalbard, Norway

Coordinates: 78.976°N 15.629°E

Arbobreen is a glacier in Dickson Land at Spitsbergen, Svalbard. It is named after Norwegian botanist Ove Arbo Høeg. The glacier is situated north of the mountain of Lagfjellet, and has a length of about 3.5 kilometers. The ridge of Snøplogen separates Arbobreen from Hodsbreen.
