= Vestfjorden (Svalbard) =

Fjord in Svalbard, Norway

Coordinates: 79°8.4′N 15°40.1′E

Map of the Indre Wijdefjorden National Park with Vestfjorden to the west.

Vestfjorden (West Fjord) is the inner, western branch of Wijdefjorden, between Andrée Land and the northern part of Dickson Land in Spitsbergen, Svalbard in Arctic Norway. It is 12 km long and 5 km wide at the inlet between Kapp Petermann, Ræstadholmen and Krosspynten. Continues on land as Vestfjorddalen to the south and later southwest. Silty rivers comes from Landingsdalen, Yggbreen and Angelbreen on the west, as well as Vestfjorddalen in the south, giving the fjord a reddish look in contrast to the green colour of Wijdefjorden.

- Norwegian Polar Institute Place Names of Svalbard Database
