= Kvitbreen =

Glacier

Coordinates: 78.973°N 17.534°E

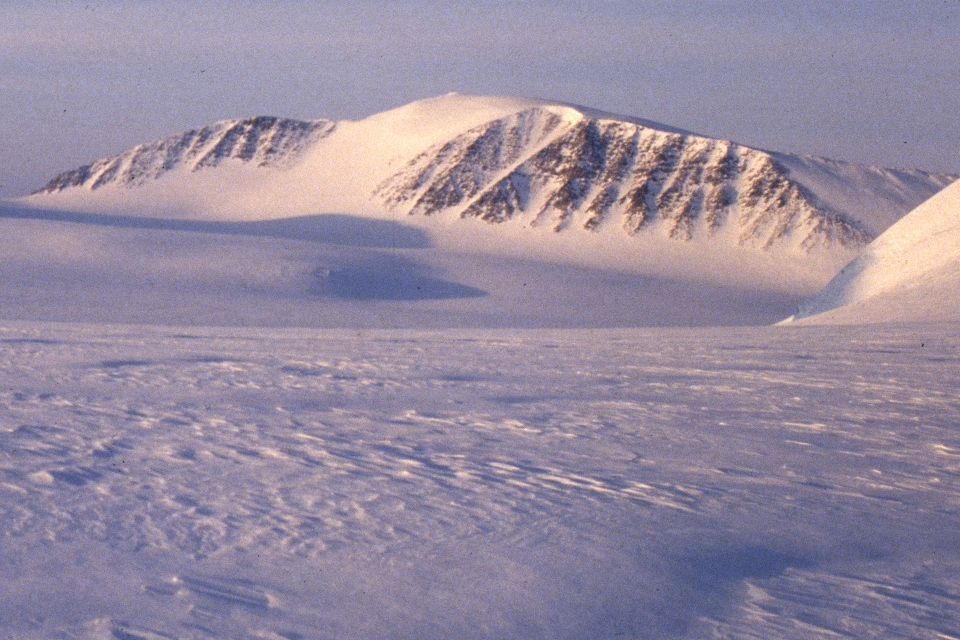
Kvitbreen and Newtontoppen

Kvitbreen (White Glacier) is a glacier in Ny-Friesland at Spitsbergen, Svalbard. It located south of Newtontoppen, and is connected with the glacier of Veteranen at the other side of Trebrepasset.
