= Ove Arbo Høeg =

Norwegian botanist

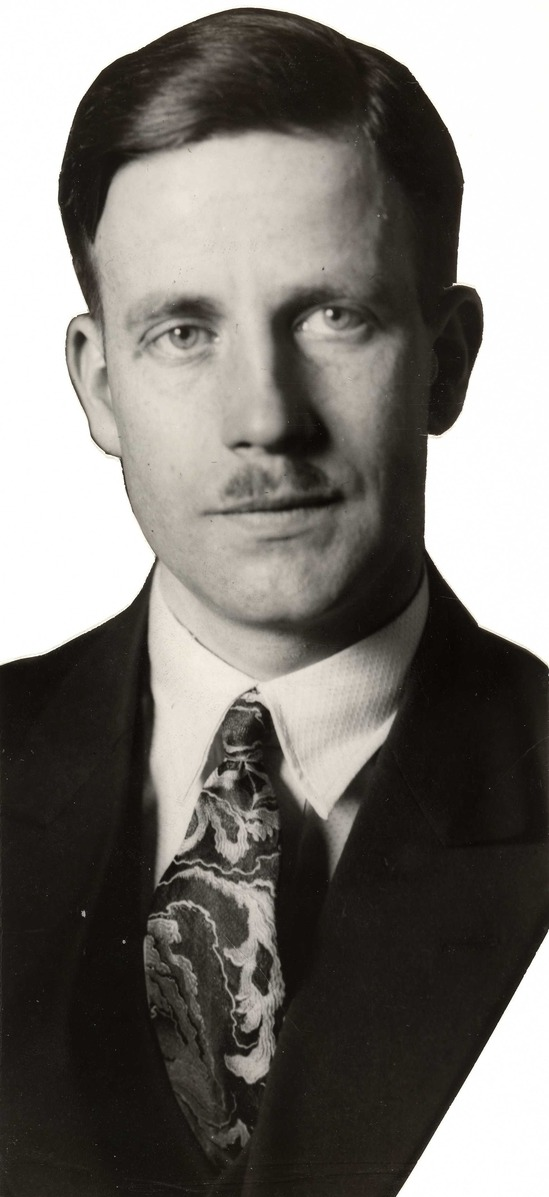
Ove in the 1930s

Ove Fredrik Arbo Høeg (25 November 1898 – 7 July 1993) was a Norwegian botanist.

== Personal life ==
Høeg was born in Larvik as a son of consul Thomas Arbo Høeg (1852–1930) and Sigrid Bugge (1862–1945). His first marriage was to physician's daughter Elisabeth Cathrine Blom (1898–1927) from July 1923. After her death Høeg married dean's daughter Ellen Susanne Fridrichsen (1900–1955) in April 1934. During this marriage he was a brother-in-law of Anton Fridrichsen. After his second wife's death, Høeg married Hjørdis Holm (1908–1992) in 1962.

== Career ==
He finished his secondary education in 1917 and graduated with the cand.real. degree from the Royal Frederick University in 1923. He served as a professor at the University of Oslo from 1947 to 1967. His research interests focused on paleobotany, and his dr.philos. thesis from 1942 was on Spitsbergen flora of the Devonian period. He studied plant fossils from other geographical areas as well, such as Canada, Russia, Africa and Himalaya. Among his later works are Planter og tradisjon from 1974, and a book on children's traditional playing with plant materials, Barkebåt og kongleku, published in 1991.

Høeg was a fellow of the Royal Norwegian Society of Sciences and Letters from 1927 and the Norwegian Academy of Science and Letters from 1941, and was an honorary member of the International Organization of Palaeobotany, Friends of the Earth Norway and the Norwegian Botanical Association. The Gunnerus Medal was bestowed upon him in 1973.

== Legacy ==
The valley of Høegdalen in Dickson Land at Spitsbergen, Svalbard is named after him, as well as the river of Høegelva and the glaciers of Høegdalsbreen and Arbobreen.
