= Ceresfjellet =

Mountain in Spitsbergen, Norway

- Location within Svalbard

Highest point
- Elevation: 1,675 m (5,495 ft)
- Coordinates: 79°8.1′N 16°55.2′E

Geography
- Location: Spitsbergen, Svalbard, Norway

Ceresfjellet is a mountain on Spitsbergen in Svalbard, Norway. At 1,675 metres (5,495 ft) tall, it is the third-largest peak on Svalbard. It is located west of Wijdefjorden and is named for the dwarf planet Ceres.
