= Waggonwaybreen =

Glacier in Svalbard

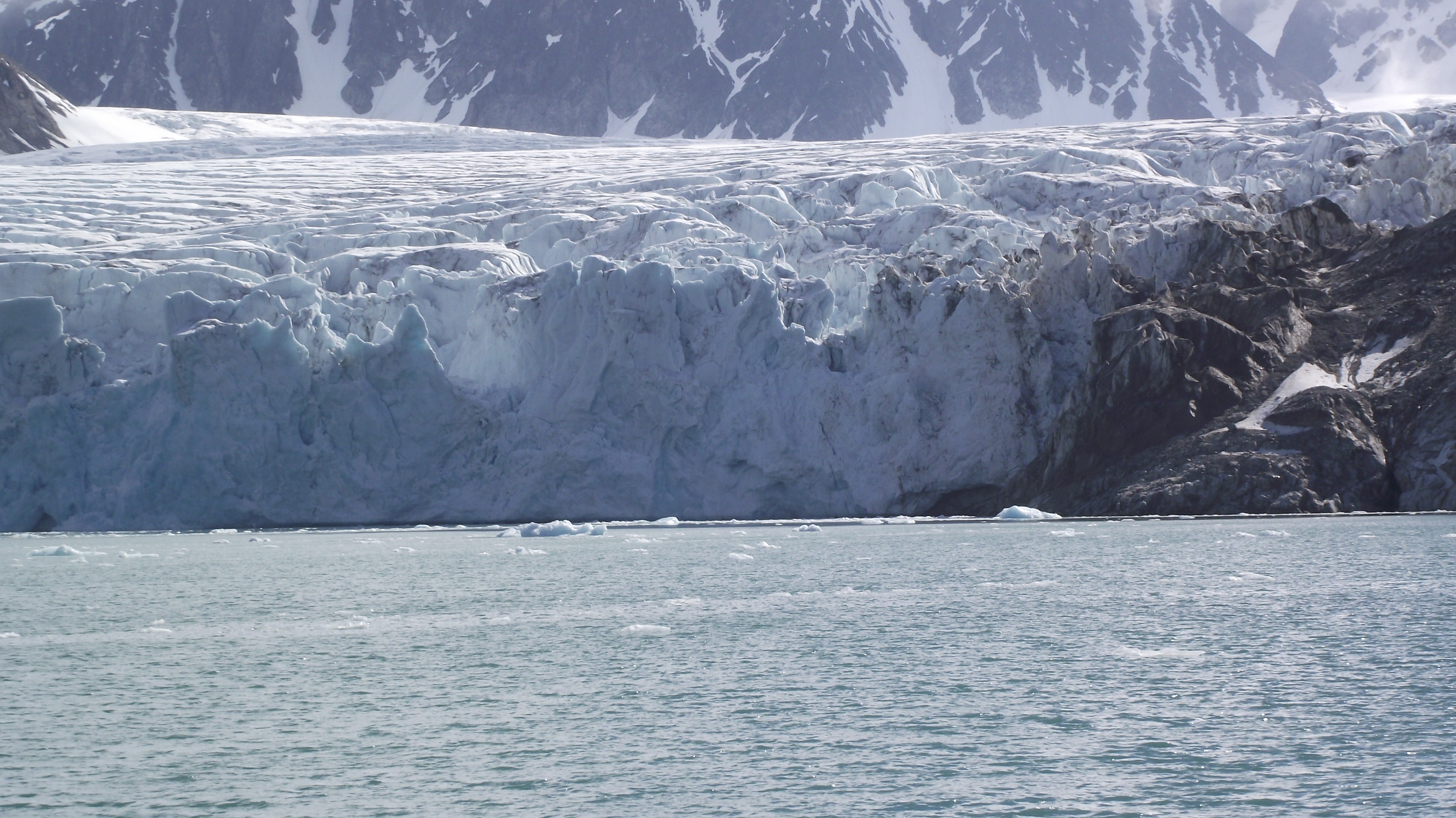

- Location within Svalbard
- Type: Glacier
- Location: Albert I Land; Spitsbergen, Svalbard
- Coordinates: 79.5219°N 11.3094°E
- Length: seven kilometers

Waggonwaybreen is a glacier in Albert I Land at Spitsbergen, Svalbard. It has a length of about seven kilometers, and debouches into Magdalenefjorden.

The glacier has retreated substantially since 1900.
