= Hochstetterbreen =

Glacier in Svalbard, Norway

Coordinates: 78°52.3′N 19°48.7′E

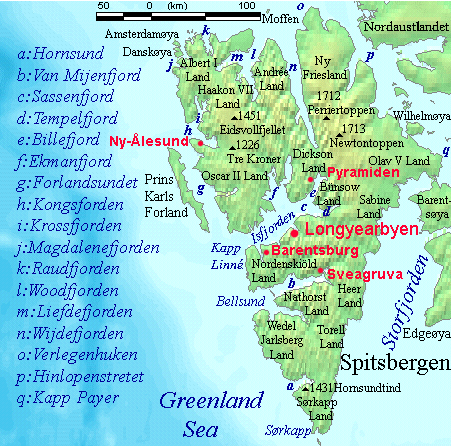
Hochstetterbreen is a glacier located in Olav V Land on Spitsbergen.

Hochstetterbreen is a glacier in Olav V Land on Spitsbergen, Svalbard. It debouches into Hinlopen Strait. The glacier is named after Austrian geographer Ferdinand von Hochstetter.
