= Elsa Celsing =

Russian-Swedish painter (1880–1974)

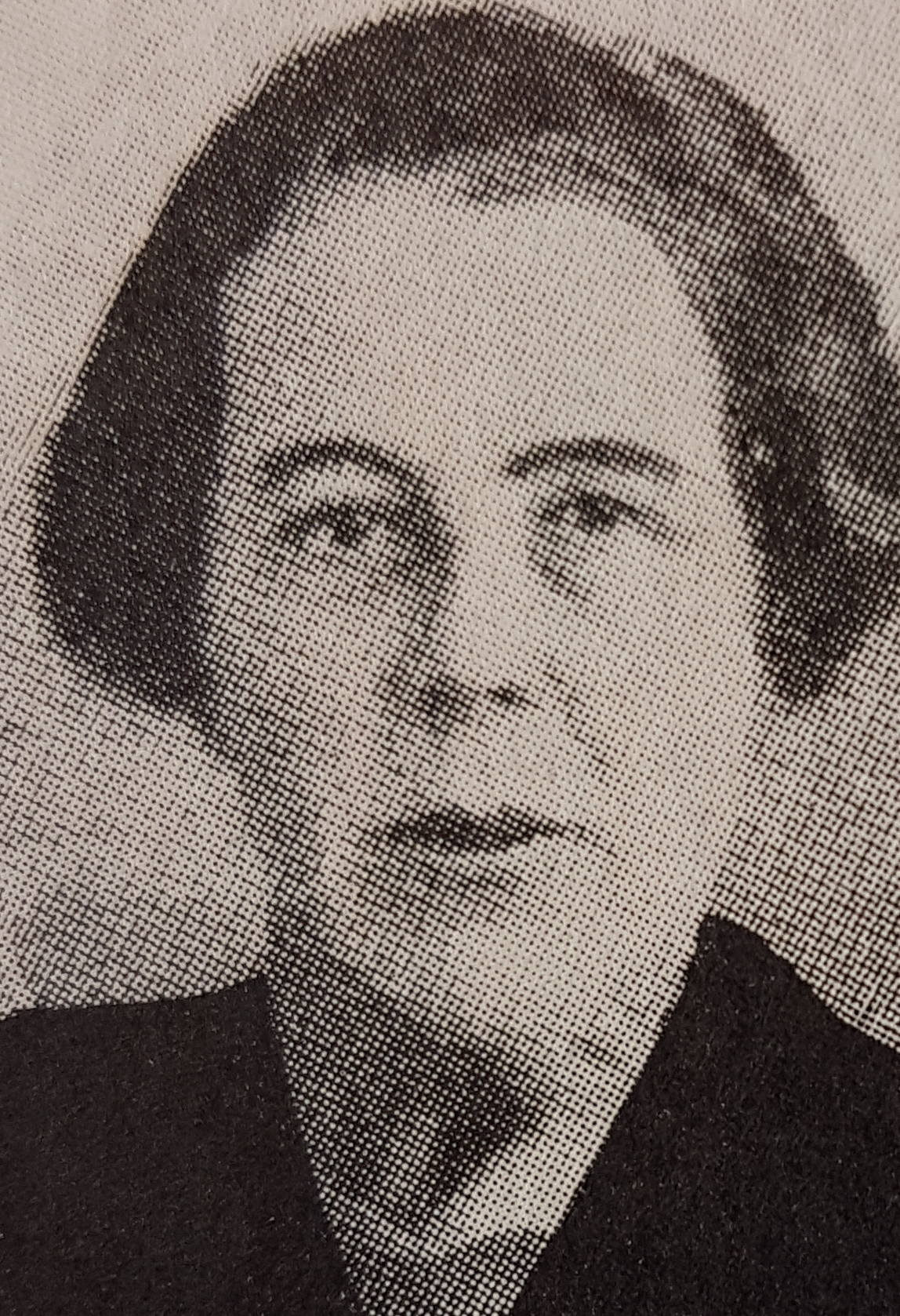
Elsa Backlund-Celsing

Elsa Celsing (25 March 1880 – 19 April 1974), also known as Elsa Backlund-Celsing, was a Russian-Swedish artist known for her portraits, still lifes, and scenes of domestic life.

== Life ==
Born Elsa Carolina Backlund, she was the daughter of Swedish-Russian astronomer Oskar Backlund and Ulrika Widebeck. She was born in Pulkovo, Russia, where her father was for many years director of the Pulkovo Observatory. She studied art in nearby St. Petersburg with Ilya Repin and later with Anders Zorn in Sweden and Eugène Carrière in Paris.

In 1912, she married Ulrik Fredrik Adolf Hugo Celsing, an agronomist, and moved to Sweden. They had three children. After her marriage, she signed her work 'E. Backlund-Celsing' in place of the earlier 'E. Celsing'.

She died in Västerås.

== Art ==
Celsing became known for her portraits, still lifes, and scenes of domestic life painted with a vibrant palette and vigorous brushwork. She took part in the Panama–Pacific International Exposition of 1915. Her work is in the Swedish National Museum, the Värmland Museum, and the Västerås Art Museum as well as in several Russian museums.
