= Gullybukta =

Bay in Svalbard, Norway

Coordinates: 79.5534°N 10.9516°E

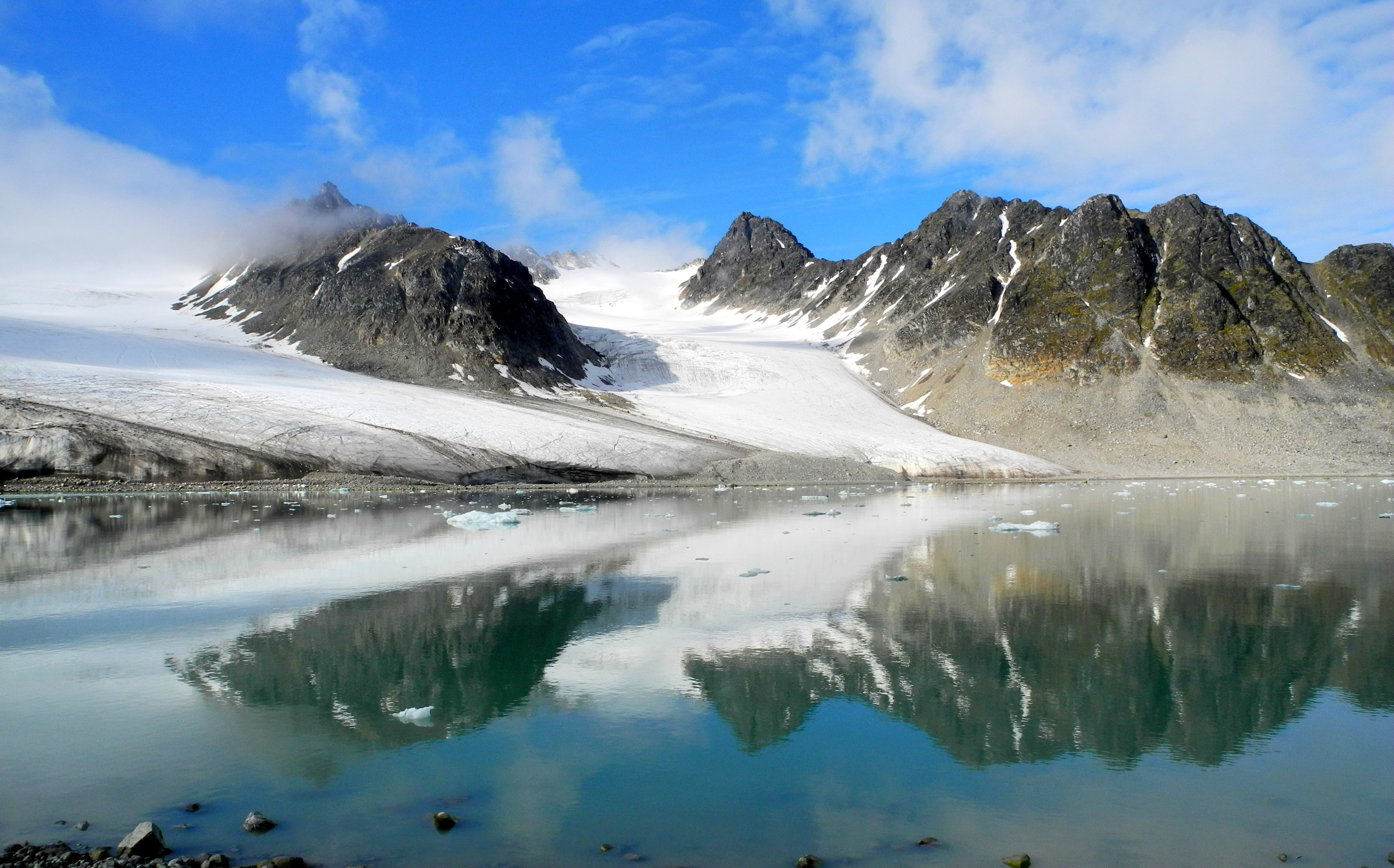
Gullybreen is debouching into Gullybukta.

Gullybukta is a southern bay of Magdalenefjorden in Albert I Land at Spitsbergen, Svalbard. The glacier Gullybreen debouches into the bay.
