= Jöns Svanberg =

Swedish clergyman and natural scientist

Jöns Svanberg (1771–1851) was a Swedish clergyman and natural scientist.

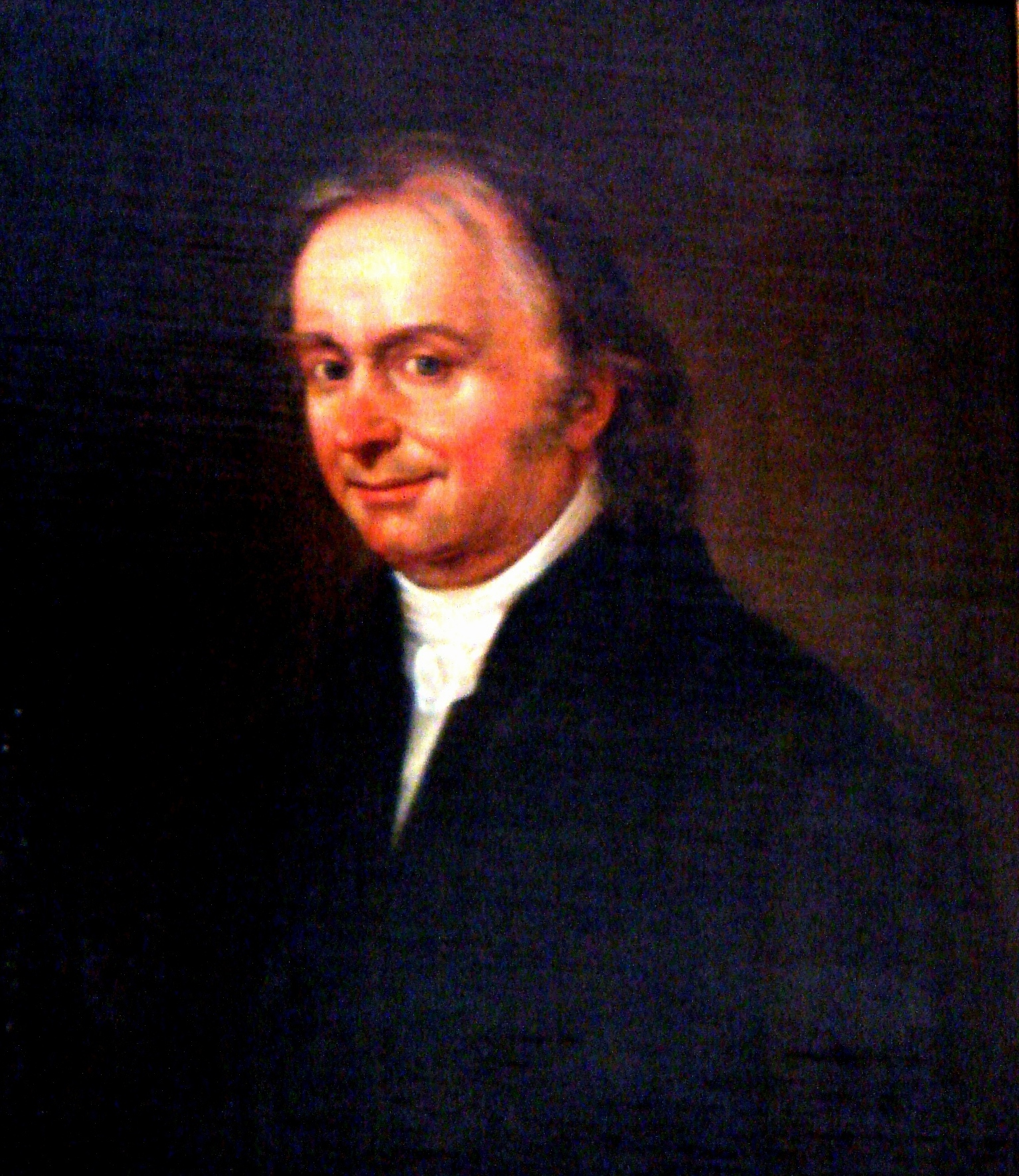
Jöns Svanberg 1771–1851.

== Life ==
He was born on 6 July 1771 in Ytterbyn, Sweden and died on 15 January 1851 in Uppsala, Sweden.

== Career ==
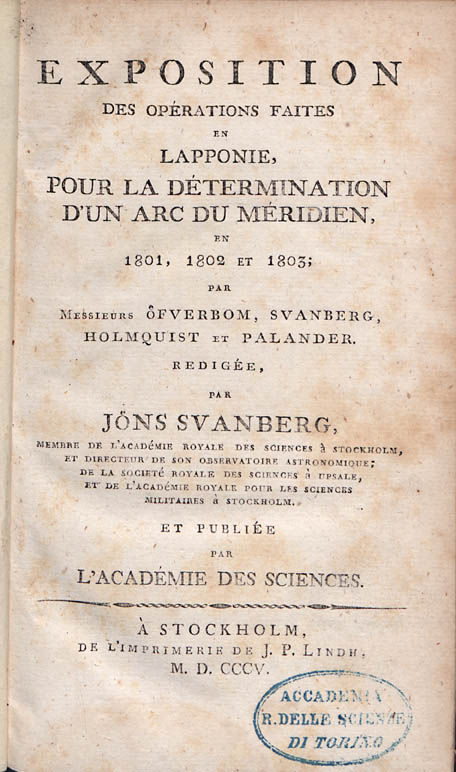
Exposition des opérations faites en Lapponie, pour la détermination d'un arc du méridien en 1801, 1802 et 1803, 1805

He entered Uppsala University at the age of 16. He received his Ph.D. in 1794. In 1806, he became the professor of surveying and in 1811 he became the professor of mathematics at Uppsala University.

In 1798, he became a member of the Royal Swedish Academy of Sciences. From 1803 to 1811, he was the secretary of the Royal Swedish Academy of Sciences. In 1822, Svanberg was elected a member of the American Philosophical Society in Philadelphia.

== Works ==
- Exposition des opérations faites en Lapponie, pour la détermination d'un arc du méridien en 1801, 1802 et 1803 (in French). Stockholm: Johan Pehr Lindh. 1805.

== Honours ==
He was the founder of Upsala Simsällskap, the Uppsala swimming society. The mountain Svanbergfjellet is named after him.

== See also ==
- Physical crystallography before X-rays
