= Åsgardfonna =

Glacier in Svalbard, Norway

Coordinates: 79°35′06″N 16°37′36″E

Åsgardfonna is a glacier in Ny-Friesland on Spitsbergen, between Wijdefjorden and Lomfjorden. The glacier covers and area of about 1,230 km^{2} (470 sq mi). It is named after Åsgard in Norse mythology. Earlier names of the glacier are Åsgårdfonna and Névé dôme Asgård.

A study published in the scientific journal Nature in 2025, based on sediment analyses from the lakes of Berglivatnet and Lakssjøen, suggests that the ice cap of Åsgardfonna survived and possibly expanded in periods during the warmer-than-present Holocene climatic optimum.
