= Woodfjorden =

Fjord in Svalbard, Norway

Coordinates: 79°35′N 13°30′E

Map of Svalbard

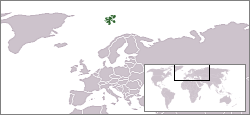
Map showing the location of the Svalbard archipelago.

Woodfjord is a fjord on the north shore of Spitsbergen island in the Svalbard archipelago. It is the fourth longest fjord in the Svalbard archipelago with the mouth facing north adjacent to Wijdefjord, and goes 64 km (40 mi) into the island, west of Andrée Land.
