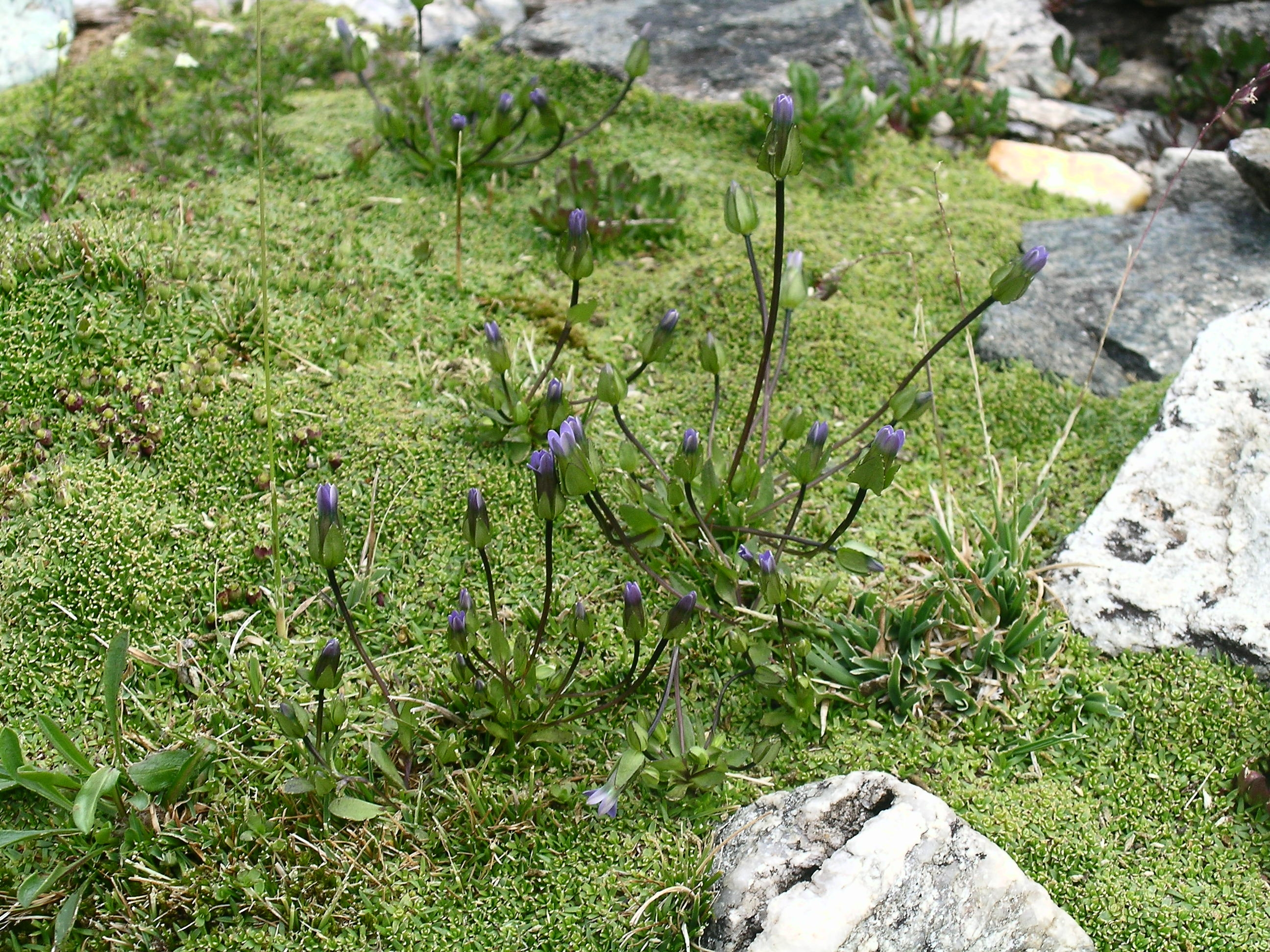

Scientific classification
- Kingdom: Plantae
- Clade: Tracheophytes
- Clade: Angiosperms
- Clade: Eudicots
- Clade: Asterids
- Order: Gentianales
- Family: Gentianaceae
- Genus: Gentianella
- Species: G. tenella

Binomial name
- Gentianella tenella L.

= Gentianella tenella =

Species of plant

Gentianella tenella, the slender gentian or Dane's dwarf gentian, is a species of the genus Gentianella.
