= Negribreen =

Glacier in Svalbard, Norway

Coordinates: 78°34′48″N 19°02′18″E

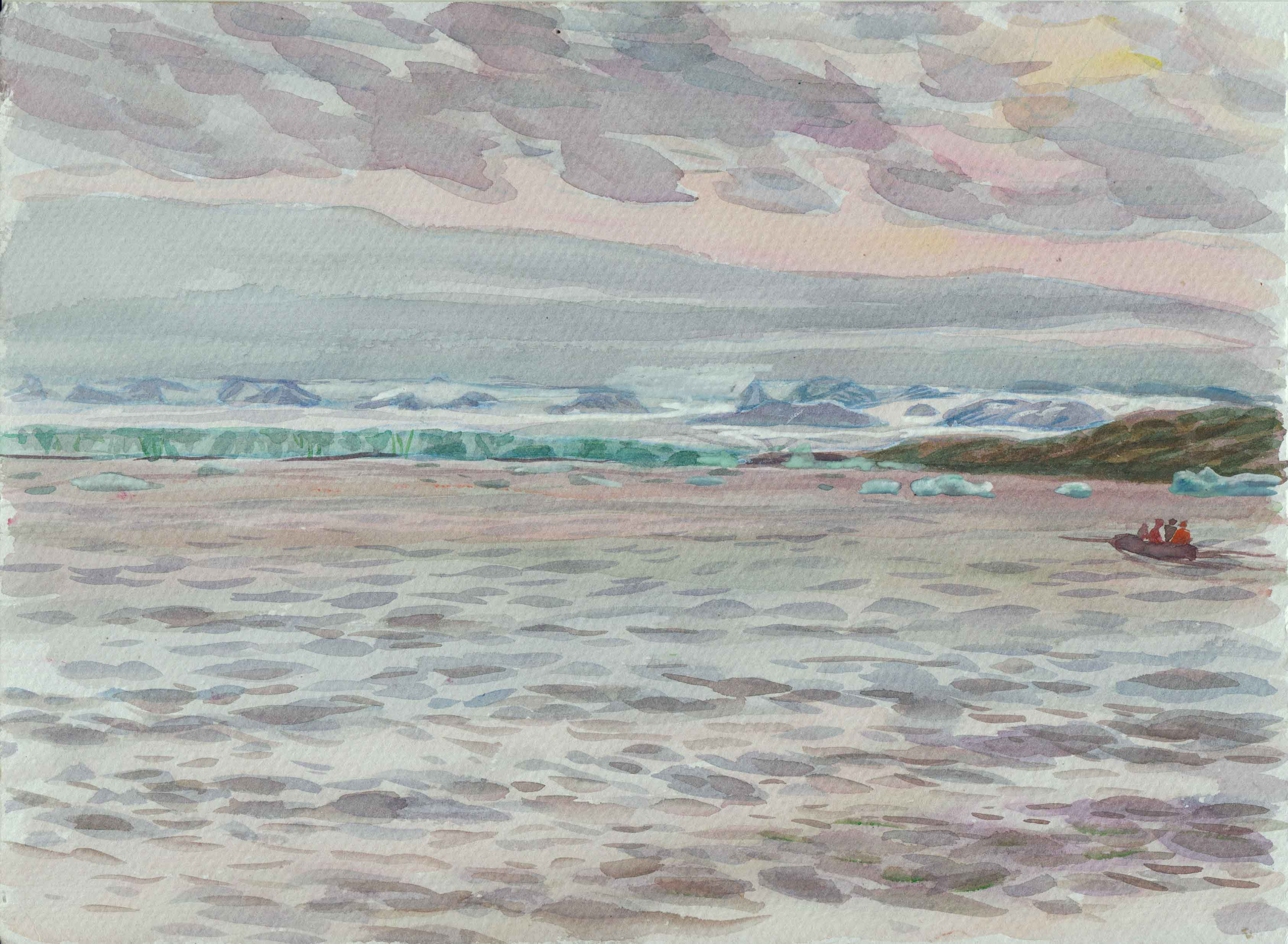
M. Presnyakov, The 2014 RGO expedition to Spitzbergen: landing at Negribreen, 2014, watercolor on paper

Negribreen is glacier at Spitsbergen, Svalbard. The glacier debouches into Storfjorden, in Olav V Land and Sabine Land, forming a wide glacier front with the moving extreme point Kapp Antinori. The glacier covers an area of about 1,180 km^{2} (460 sq mi). It is named after Italian geographer Christoforo Negri.
