= Hamburgbukta =

Bay in Hoelhalvøya, Svalbard, Norway

Coordinates: 79°31.8′N 10°41.8′E

Hamburgbukta (English: Hamburg Bay) is a one-kilometer-long bay on the western side of Hoelhalvøya, Albert I Land, Spitsbergen in the Svalbard archipelago.

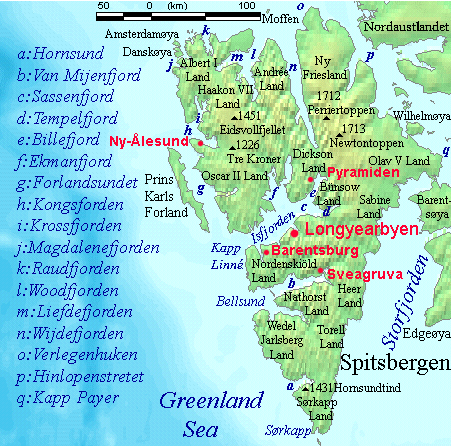
Hamburgbukta lies just below Magdalenafjorden (j), on the peninsula, Hoelhalvøya, that forms its southern shore.

== History ==
The French were the first to occupy it in 1633, calling it Port Louis or Refuge Français. On the southern shore of the bay they built a whaling station. In 1634 two English men-of-war tried to drive out the French, but failed. In 1637 they were driven out of Hamburgbukta by the Danes. They abandoned it in the following year after being harassed by the Danes once more. It was named Ulfeldts Bay by the Danes, in honor of Corfits Ulfeldt, who was responsible for driving away the French in 1637–38. In 1644 the first Hamburg ships came to the bay. They came to the bay again in 1648, and in later years, which resulted in the bay being named after the German port.

Later the bay was used by Russian trappers. In 1818, a British expedition, while anchored in Magdalenefjorden, which lies just to the north, they met Russian hunters from Hamburgbukta. One of the British officers went with them to the bay, where he found that they had built "a comfortable wooden hut, well lined with moss, divided into three compartments".
