= Stonebreen =

Glacier in Svalbard, Norway

Coordinates: 77°48.8′N 23°47.3′E

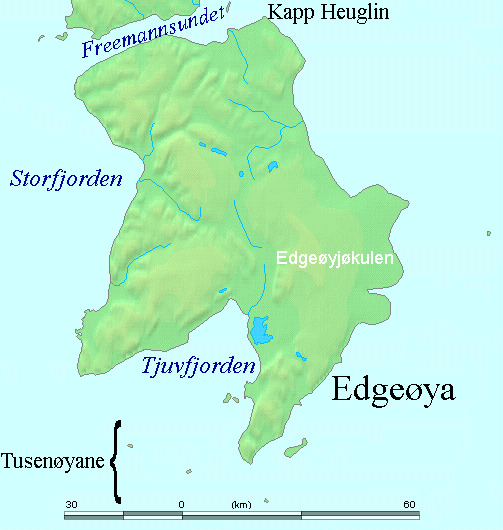
Stonebreen is a glacier located on the eastern coast of Edgeøya, Svalbard.

Stonebreen is a glacier on Edgeøya, Svalbard. The glacier extends into the sea, and defines the eastern point of the island. Former names of the glacier include Disco Hook, Steinnase and Stansforelandshuk.
