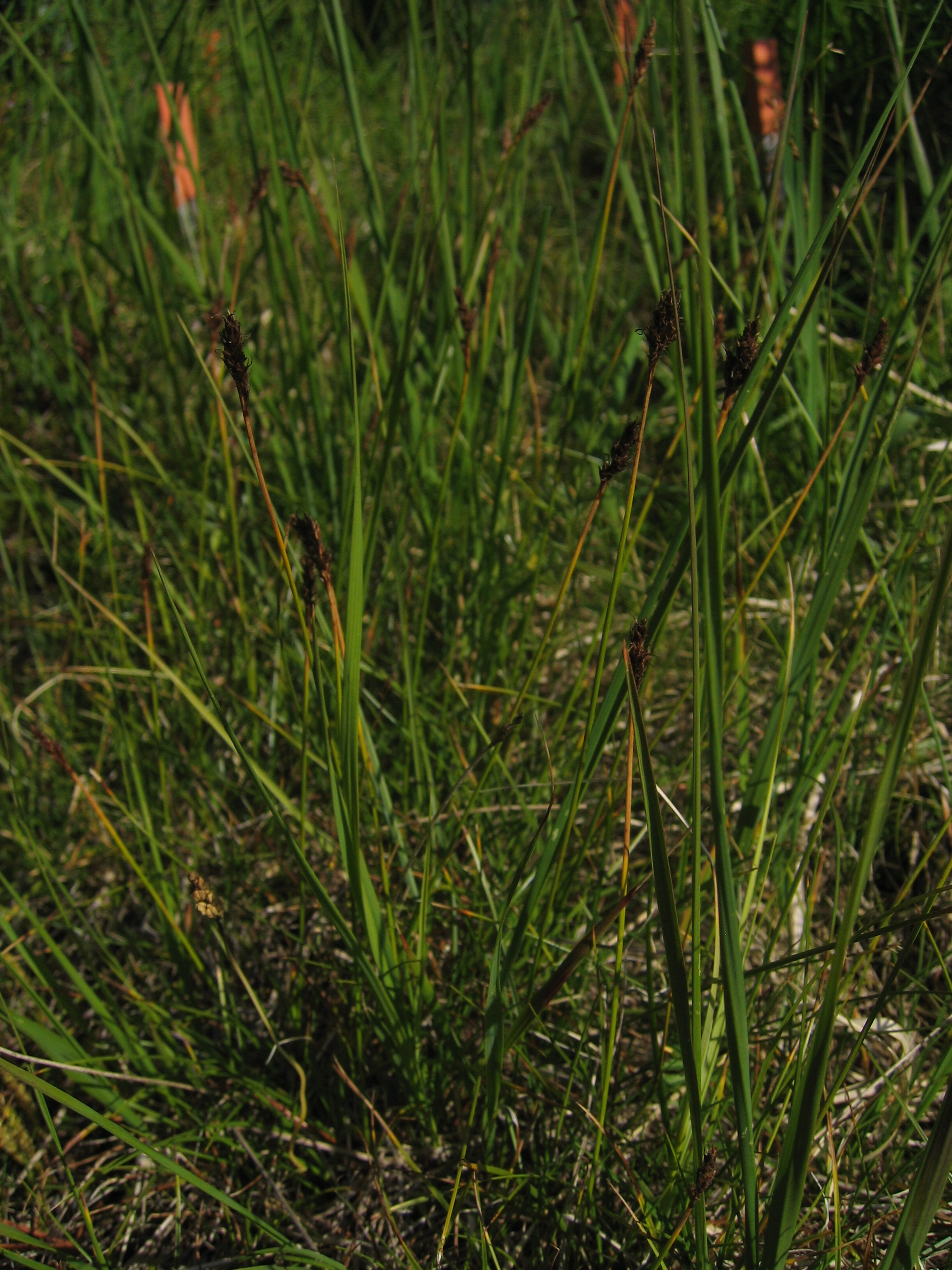

Conservation status
- Secure (NatureServe)

Scientific classification
- Kingdom: Plantae
- Clade: Embryophytes
- Clade: Tracheophytes
- Clade: Angiosperms
- Clade: Monocots
- Clade: Commelinids
- Order: Poales
- Family: Cyperaceae
- Genus: Carex
- Species: C. simpliciuscula

Binomial name
- Carex simpliciuscula Wahlenb.

Subspecies
- K. s. ssp. simpliciuscula; K. s. subsp. subfilifolia; K. s. subsp. subholarctica

Synonyms
- Kobresia simpliciuscula (Wahlenb.) Mack.

= Carex simpliciuscula =

Species of flowering plant

Carex simpliciuscula is a species of sedge known by the common names false sedge, simple bog sedge and simple kobresia. It has a circumpolar distribution, occurring throughout the northern latitudes of the Northern Hemisphere.

This perennial plant forms tufts of several triangular stems reaching up to 50 centimeters (20 in) in height. It has short rhizomes. The leaves are up to 20 centimeters (7.9 in) long. The inflorescence contains up to 12 spikes of flowers. Light is required for the seeds to germinate.

This plant occurs on tundra and in alpine climates. It grows in wet habitat types such as ponds and meadows. It often grows in calcareous substrates such as limestone.
