= Helge Backlund =

Swedish geologist and paleontologist (1878–1958)

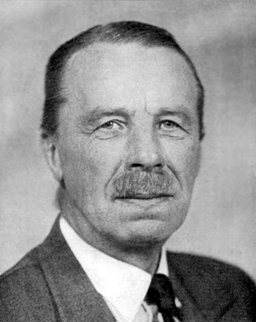

Helge Götrik Backlund or Oleg Oskarovich Baklund in the Russian form (September 3, 1878 – January 29, 1958) was a Swedish geologist and mineralogist. He grew up and worked in the Russian Empire before moving to become a professor at the University of Uppsala. He had a special interest in the formation of granites and gneiss.

== Life and work ==
Backlund was born in Dorpat to Ulrika Widebeck and Johan Oskar Backlund (1846–1916) who was later the director of the observatory at Pulkovo. Backlund grew up in the outskirts of St. Petersburg, Russia. He became interested in the natural sciences at an early age and after studies at the German Katarina Gymnasium in St. Petersburg he went to the university to study geology. He graduated in 1908 and defended his doctoral thesis in 1914. He took part in the Swedish-Russian expedition to Spitzbergen 1899–1901 under F. N. Chernyshev during which he studied basalts. In 1906–1907 he worked in Vienna under Friedrich Becke and published “Über die Olivingruppe” (1909). In 1908, he became curator of the geological museum at the Academy of Sciences in St. Petersburg. He travelled to Siberia to study the geology of the Urals. In 1911 he went on an oil exploration mission into the Taimyr Peninsula. He also took part in an exploration of copper ores in the Urals. In 1914 he married Hildegard Dischner. In 1917 he was forced to flee Russia during the revolution and moved to Sweden and then to the Åbo Akademi University in Turku in 1918. In 1924 he became a professor of geology at the University of Uppsala, succeeding a position held by Arvid Högbom. He became interested in studies on gneiss from 1929 after a visit to Greenland with Lauge Koch.

Backlund received an honorary doctorate from the University of Vienna in 1940 which was prompted by support from Leo von zur Mühlen and was political supported by the Reich Education Ministry who saw him as a supporter of "German ideas". In 1927 he received an honorary doctorate from Uppsala University. In 1928 he was one of the founders of the Swedish Mineralogical Society. He retired in 1943 and received the Gustav Steinmann Medal. He was a visiting professor in England and Spain in 1948 and 1952. He died in Uppsala and was buried in the old cemetery in Fjärdingen.
