= Gåshamna =

Bay in Svalbard, Norway

Coordinates: 76°56′36″N 15°50′54″E

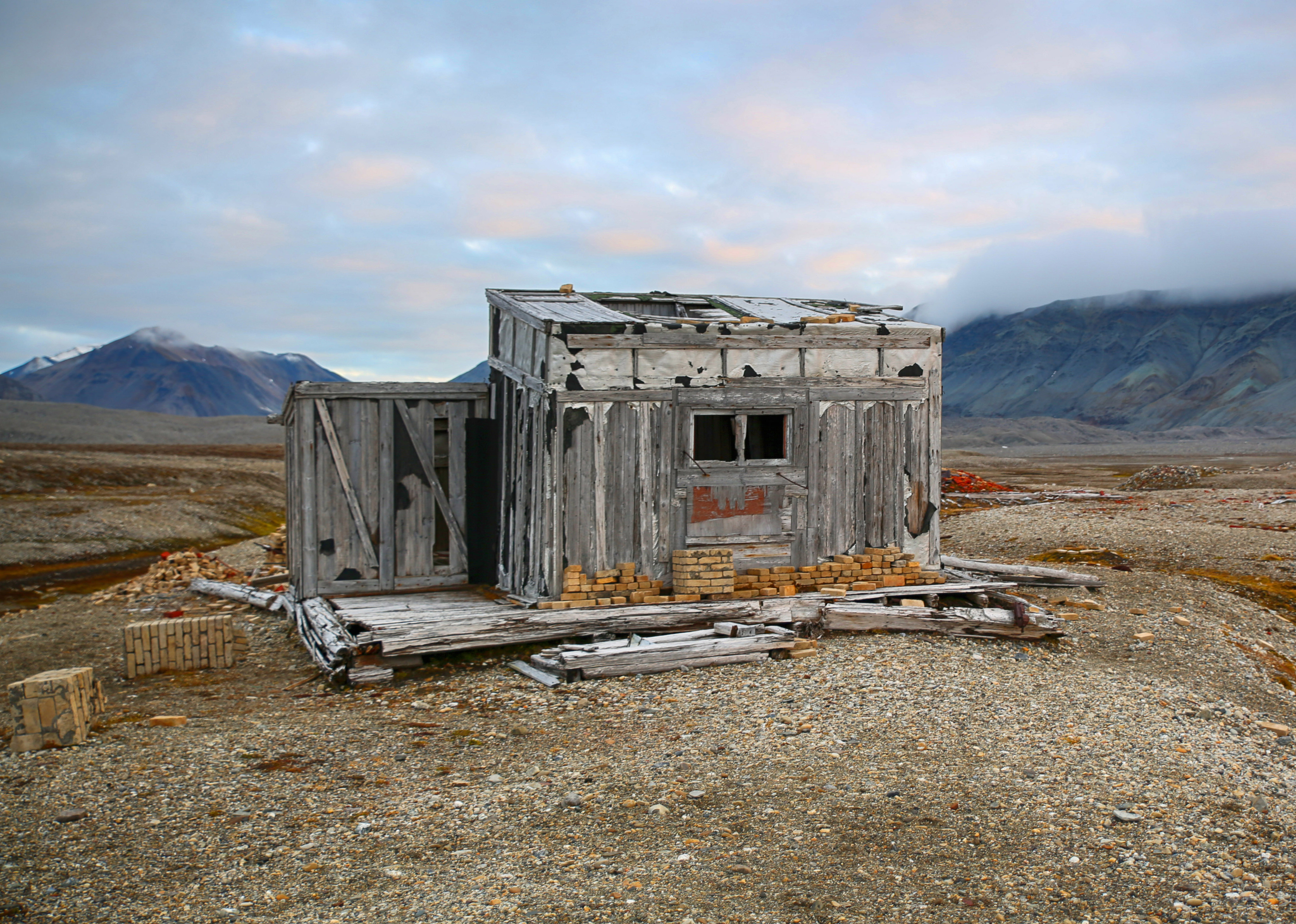
The Konstantinovka cabin in Gåshamna in 2019

Gåshamna is a bay at the southern side of Hornsund, Sørkapp Land, on Spitsbergen, Svalbard. The bay has a width of about 2 km, and is included within the Sør-Spitsbergen National Park.
