= Puccinellia tenella =

Scientific classification
- Kingdom: Plantae
- Clade: Tracheophytes
- Clade: Angiosperms
- Clade: Monocots
- Clade: Commelinids
- Order: Poales
- Family: Poaceae
- Subfamily: Pooideae
- Genus: Puccinellia
- Species: P. tenella

Binomial name
- Puccinellia tenella (Lange) Holmb.

Species of grass

Puccinellia tenella is a species of grass in the family Poaceae.

Its native range is Subarctic to Northeastern USA.

Synonyms:

- Puccinellia svalbardensis
