= Holtedahlfonna =

Glacier at Spitsbergen, Norway

Coordinates: 79°00′N 14°00′E

Holtedahlfonna is a glacier at Haakon VII Land on Spitsbergen, Svalbard, between Wijdefjorden and Kongsfjorden. The glacier covers an area of about 1,375 km^{2} (531 sq mi), and is the second largest ice cap on Spitsbergen. It is named after Norwegian geologist and polar explorer Olaf Holtedahl.
