= Perriertoppen =

Mountain

- Location within Svalbard

Highest point
- Elevation: 1,712 m (5,617 ft)
- Prominence: 562 m (1,844 ft)
- Coordinates: 79°9′13″N 16°46′47″E

Naming
- English translation: Perrier Peak
- Language of name: English

Geography
- Location: Spitsbergen, Svalbard

Geology
- Rock age: Late Silurian
- Mountain type: Granite

Perriertoppen is the second highest mountain in Svalbard, at 1712 m. It is located in the north east of the island of Spitsbergen. The mountain is late Silurian granite.
