= Newtontoppen =

Mountain

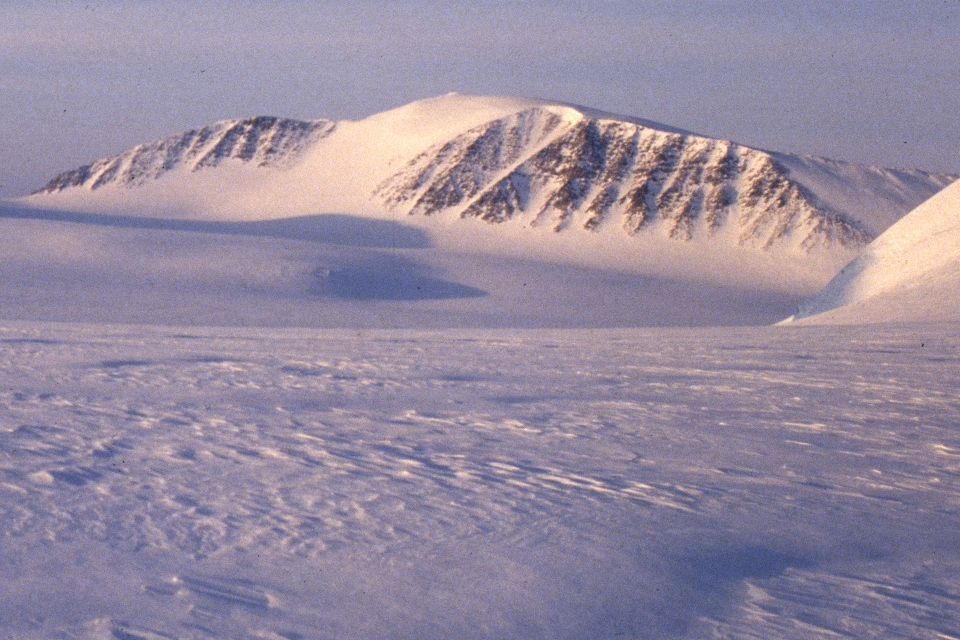
- Southwestern face of Newtontoppen, 1988

Highest point
- Elevation: 1,713 m (5,620 ft)
- Prominence: 1,713 m (5,620 ft)
- Isolation: 743.73 km (462.13 mi)
- Listing: Ultra
- Coordinates: 79°0′38″N 17°29′27″E

Naming
- English translation: Newton Peak
- Language of name: English

Geography
- Location within Svalbard
- Location: Spitsbergen, Svalbard

Geology
- Rock age: Late Silurian
- Mountain type: Granite

Climbing
- First ascent: 4 August 1900, Helge Backlund

Newtontoppen (Newton Peak) is the largest and highest mountain in Svalbard, at 1,713 metres (5,620 ft). Its peak is the highest point on Svalbard. It is located at the north east corner on the island of Spitsbergen in the Chydeniusfjella range. The nearest settlement is the formerly Soviet coal mining settlement Pyramiden. The mountain is mostly made of Silurian granite. The mountain was first ascended by Helge Backlund on 4 August 1900.

== Etymology ==
The mountain was named after Isaac Newton in 1898. The surrounding mountains were named after other famous astronomers and mathematicians the same year.

== See also ==
- List of European ultra-prominent peaks
