= Billefjorden =

Fjord in Svalbard, Norway

Coordinates: 78°35′N 16°28′E

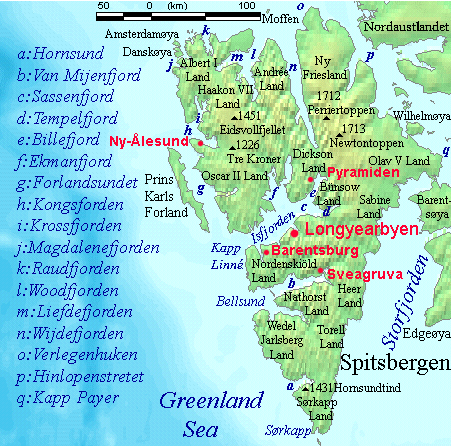
Billfjorden (labelled e) is on Spitsbergen's west coast

Billefjorden is the central fjord of the three branching from the innermost part of the Isfjorden to the northeast, in Svalbard, Norway. It is 30 km long and 5–8 km wide. Billefjorden lies between Dickson Land to the northwest and Bünsow Land in the southeast. Located on its northwestern shore is the former Russian coal mining community of Pyramiden (abandoned in 1998). To the northeast is Nordenskiöldbreen (Nordenskiöld Glacier). At its northeastern extreme is Adolf Bay.

The fjord is named after the Dutch whaler Cornelius Claeszoon Bille, who is mentioned as being active in 1675 by the Dutch whaler Cornelius Gisbert Zorgdrager. Originally another bay (now known as Adventfjorden) had been labeled as Klass Billen Bay, but Dunér and Nordenskiöld moved it to its present location.

The fjord is the site of the Billefjorden Fault Zone, which continues to the north and separates Svalbard’s north-eastern and north-western terranes. In addition to the Pyramidan coal, gypsum is mined on the north side of the bay, at Skansbukta.

== Sources ==
- Conway, W. M. 1906. No Man's Land: A History of Spitsbergen from Its Discovery in 1596 to the Beginning of the Scientific Exploration of the Country. Cambridge: At the University Press.
- Norwegian Polar Institute: Place names in Norwegian polar areas
