= Lomfjorden =

Fjord in Svalbard, Norway

Coordinates: 79°31′00″N 17°53′42″E

Lomfjorden (English: The Loon Fjord) is a fjord at the eastern coast of Spitsbergen, Svalbard. It has a length of about 35 km (22 mi). Former names of the fjord include Bear Bay, Lamber Bay, Loom Bay, Lomme Fjord and Lommen baij.
