= Andrée Land (Svalbard) =

Land area between Wijdefjorden and Woodfjorden on Svalbard in Arctic Norway

Coordinates: 79°22′04″N 14°42′19″E

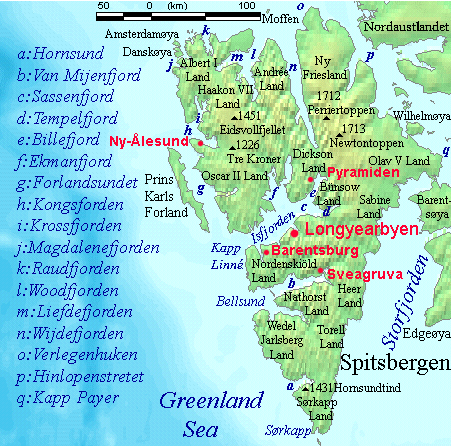
Andrée Land is a peninsula located at the northern side of Spitsbergen, between Wijdefjorden and Woodfjorden.

Andrée Land is the land area between Wijdefjorden and Woodfjorden on Spitsbergen, Svalbard in Arctic Norway. Limited in the south by a line from Woodfjorden through Vonbreen to Holtedahlfonna eastwards to the upper part of Abrahamsenbreen through Ruskbreen, Millarpasset, Lisbetbreen and Vestfjorddalen to Vestfjorden.

The area is named after Swedish engineer and polar explorer Salomon August Andrée.
