= Magdalenefjorden =

Fjord between Reuschhalvøya and Hoelhalvøya on the west coast of Spitsbergen

Coordinates: 79°33.9′N 10°52.5′E

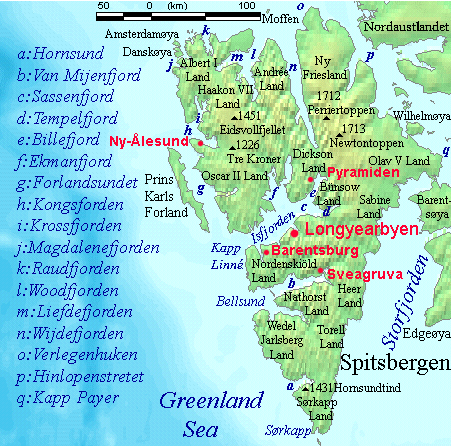
Magdalenefjorden (labeled j) lies on Spitsbergen's west coast.

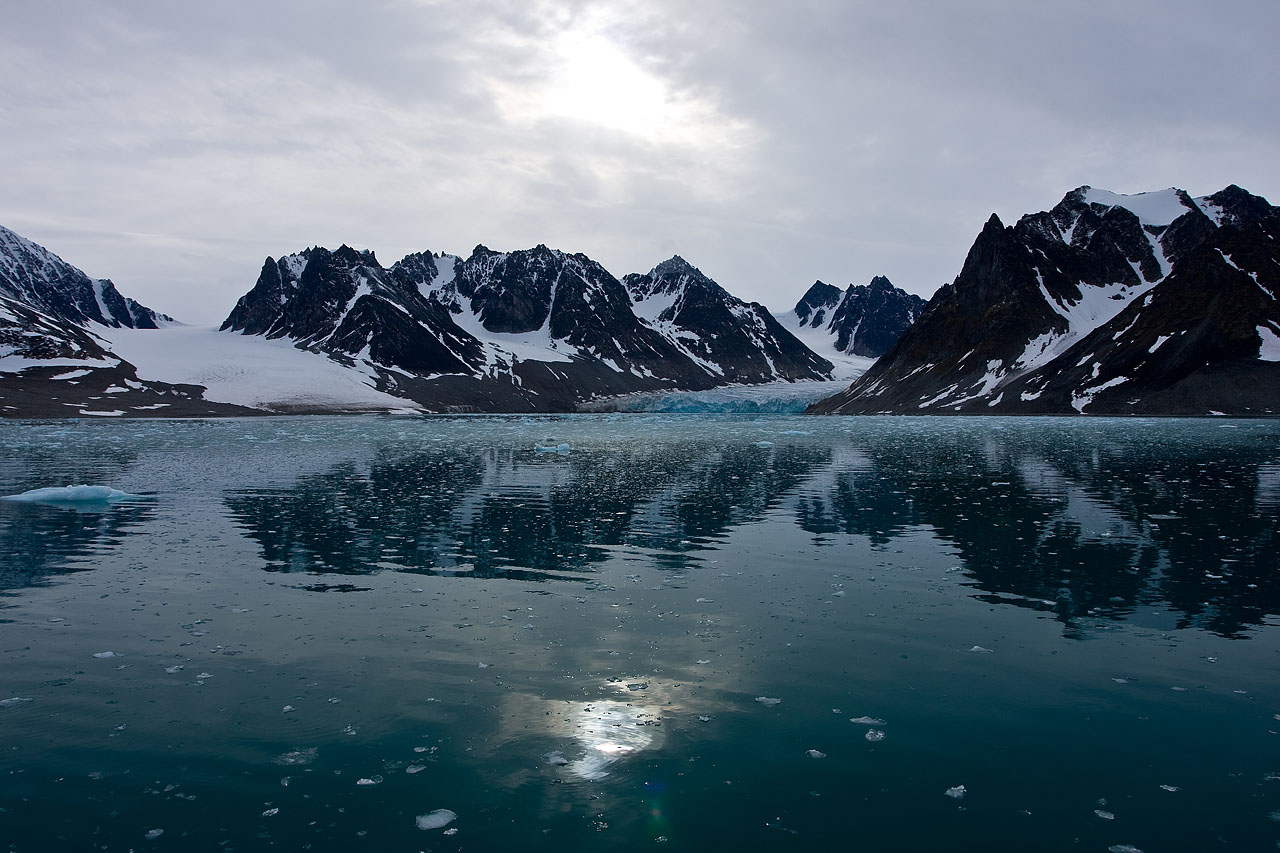
Jagged mountains in the Magdalenefjorden

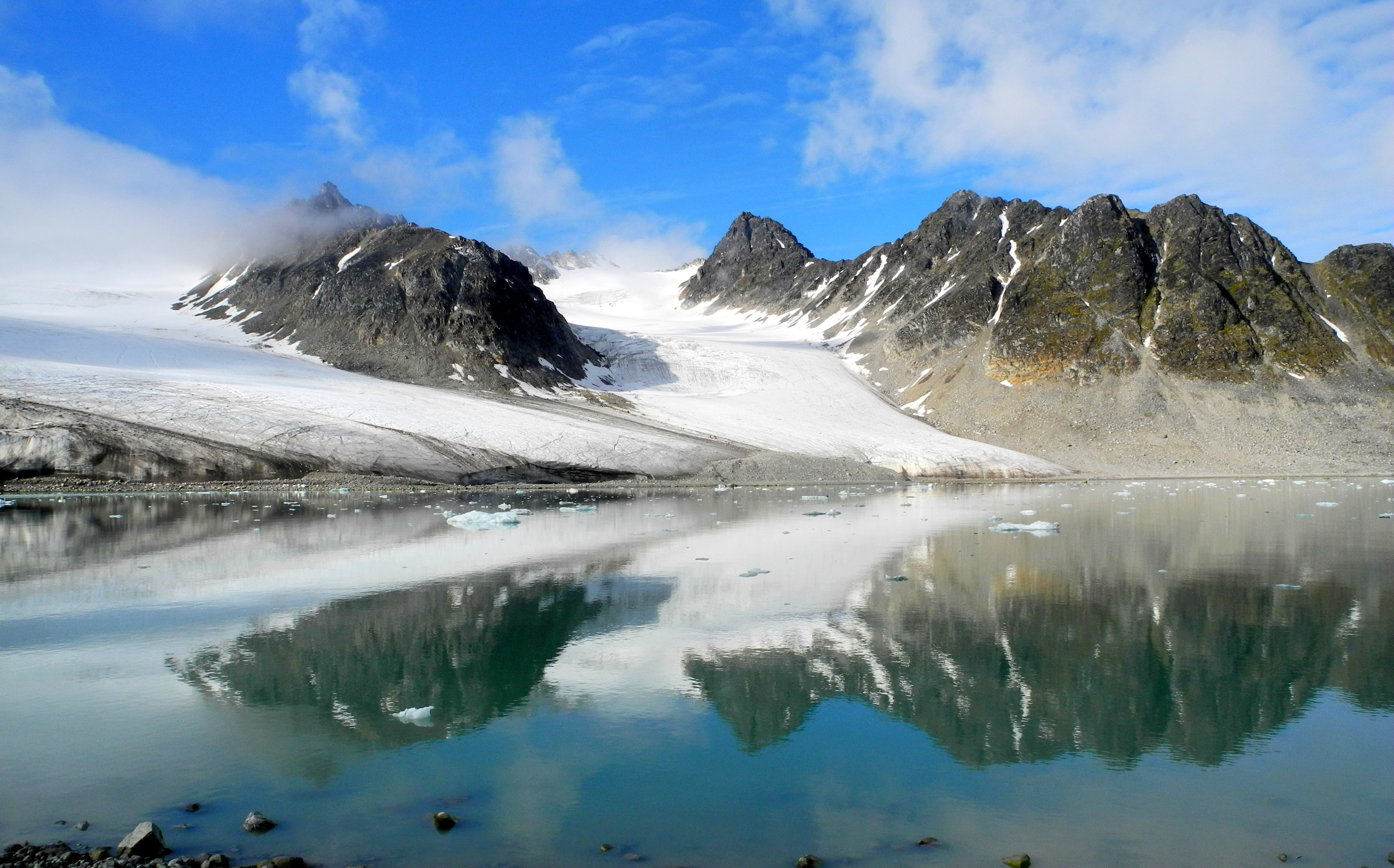
Gullybukta and Gullybreen

Magdalenefjorden is an 8 km long and up to 5 km wide fjord between Reuschhalvøya and Hoelhalvøya, Albert I Land, on the west coast of Spitsbergen, the largest island in the Svalbard archipelago. It is large enough to accommodate even the largest of cruise ships which are even able to turn through 180 degrees in the fjord. On the south shore of the fjord is the bay Gullybukta.

== History ==
William Barents was the first to explore Magdalenefjorden in 1596. Here he found walrus tusks, which caused him to name the fjord Tusk Bay. The English explorer and whaler Robert Fotherby entered the fjord in 1614, claiming it for King James I of England and naming it Maudlen Sound, and the small, sheltered bay on its southern shore Trinity Harbor. The English subsequently established a whaling station in Trinity Harbor, on what is now called Gravneset. It was later taken back by the Dutch. The remains of four blubber ovens or furnaces have been found on Gravneset, as well as a graveyard containing about 130 graves dating from the 17th to the late 18th century.

The Dutchman Joris Carolus (1614) was the first to label the fjord Mari mag. bay. Abraham Goos (1620) called it Magdalenen sond, and Guljelmus Cæsius (1622) S. Maria Magdalene sond.
