= Austfjorden (Svalbard) =

Fjord

Coordinates: 79°12′0″N 16°0′0″E

Map of the Indre Wijdefjorden National Park with Austfjorden in the south.

Austfjorden is a fjord in Spitsbergen, Svalbard in Arctic Norway. The fjord (East Fjord), measuring 32 kilometres (20 miles in length) is located in the east of the Indre Wijdefjorden National Park.
