= Olav V Land =

Peninsula

Coordinates: 78°48′N 19°3′E

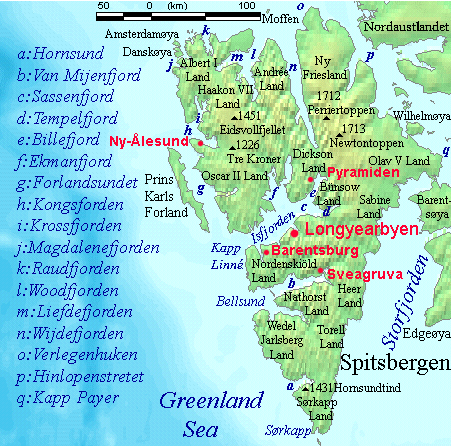
Olav V Land is a peninsula located at the eastern side of Spitsbergen, west of Hinlopen Strait and Ginevra Bay.

Olav V Land is a peninsula in eastern Spitsbergen Island, Svalbard named after Olav V of Norway. It is covered by the Olav V Icefield, measuring about 4,150 square kilometres (1,600 sq mi).

The only larger ice cap in the Svalbard Archipelago is Austfonna in Nordaustlandet, with an area of 8,492 km^{2} (3,279 sq mi).
