= Dickson Land =

Land area at Spitsbergen, Svalbard

Coordinates: 78°50′18″N 15°54′42″E

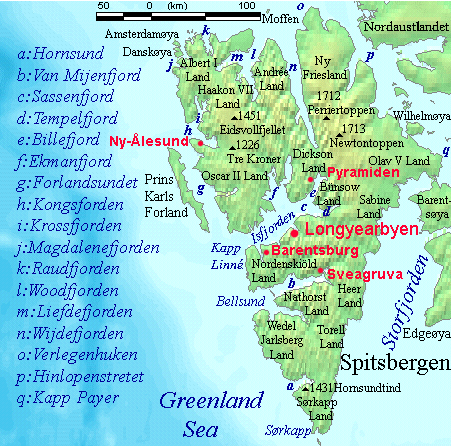
Dickson Land is located between Isfjorden and Wijdefjorden.

Dickson Land is a land area between Isfjorden and Wijdefjorden at Spitsbergen, Svalbard. It forms a peninsula between the Isfjorden branches Billefjorden and Dicksonfjorden. Dickson Land is named after Oscar Dickson.
