= Wijdefjorden =

Fjord in Svalbard, Norway

Coordinates: 79°30′N 15°30′E

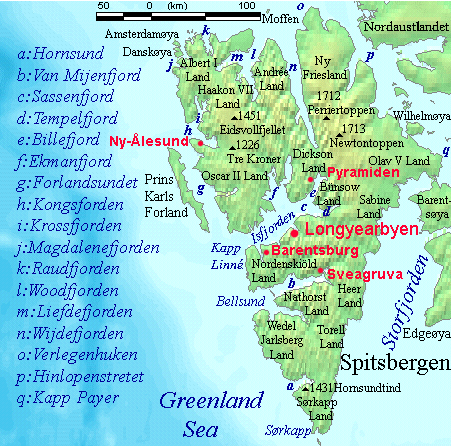
Wijdefjord (labelled n) lies in the north of Spitsbergen.

Wijdefjord is the longest fjord in Norway's Svalbard archipelago. Wijdefjord is located in the northern portion of the island of Spitsbergen, which lies in the Arctic Ocean about midway between Norway and the North Pole, and is the largest island in the archipelago. The fjord is 108 km (67 mi) long. Opening on Spitsbergen's north coast, it runs roughly southwards into the interior, separating Andrée Land in the west from Margaretas Land in the east. The southern half of the fjord is part of Indre Wijdefjorden National Park.
