= Ny-Friesland =

Peninsula in Svalbard, Norway

Coordinates: 79°00′N 17°00′E

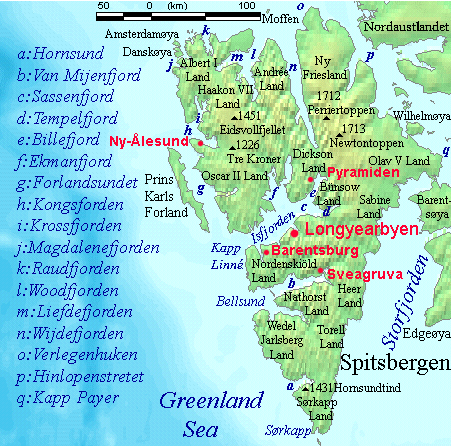
Ny-Friesland is a peninsula located at the northern side of Spitsbergen, between Wijdefjorden and Hinlopen Strait.

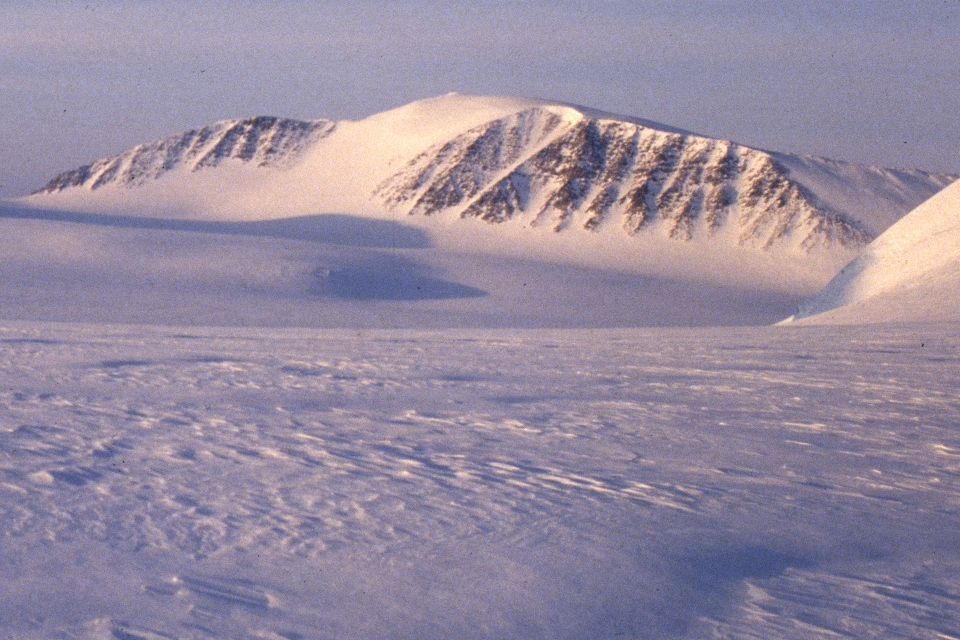
Newtontoppen, the highest mountain of Svalbard, is located at Ny-Friesland

Ny-Friesland is the land area between Wijdefjorden and Hinlopen Strait on Spitsbergen, Svalbard.

The area is named after the Dutch province of Friesland.
