= Breinesflya =

Coastal plain of Spitsbergen, Norway

Coordinates: 76.8180°N 15.8160°E

Breinesflya is a coastal plain at the western coast of Sørkapp Land at Spitsbergen, Svalbard. It has a length of about twelve kilometers, extending from the river of Vinda to Raksodden. Slaklielva from Gråkallbreen through Slaklidalen flows across Breinesflya, as does Lidelva coming from Liddalen. At the northeastern side of the plain are the mountains Wiederfjellet and Lidfjellet.
