= Bungeleira =

Geographical feature of Norway

Coordinates: 76°45′13″N 16°05′56″E

Bungeleira is a plain in Sørkapp Land at Spitsbergen, Svalbard. It is located south of Bungebreen and Plogen and north of Tørrflya. The plain is named after Russian Arctic explorer Alexandr Alexandrovich Bunge. The river of Bungeelva flows from Bungevatnet and passes between Tørrflya and Bungeleira and the front of the glacier of Vitkovskijbreen.
