= Hilmarfjellet =

Mountain in Svalbard, Norway

Coordinates: 76.7431°N 16.3190°E

Hilmarfjellet is a mountain in Sørkapp Land at Spitsbergen, Svalbard. Its highest peak is 810 m.a.s.l., with a secondary peak of about 700 m, and it is located northeast of the plain Bjørnbeinflya, at the western side of Olsokbreen. The mountain is named after hunter and sailor Hilmar Andreas Nilsen Nøis. The northern side of the mountain is covered by the glacier Nøisbreen, and Vitkovskijbreen is located northwest of the mountain.
