= Fisneset =

Headland in Spitsbergen, Svalbard

Coordinates: 76.7117°N 16.2266°E

Fisneset (Fart Headland) is a headland in Sørkapp Land at Spitsbergen, Svalbard. It is located at the southwestern shore of Spitsbergen, northwest of the bay Stormbukta, between Olsokflya and Bjørnbeinflya. The headland is named from the smell of hydrogen sulfide emerging from springs at the site.
