= Brazybreen =

Glacier in Svalbard, Norway

Coordinates: 76.7524°N 16.6107°E

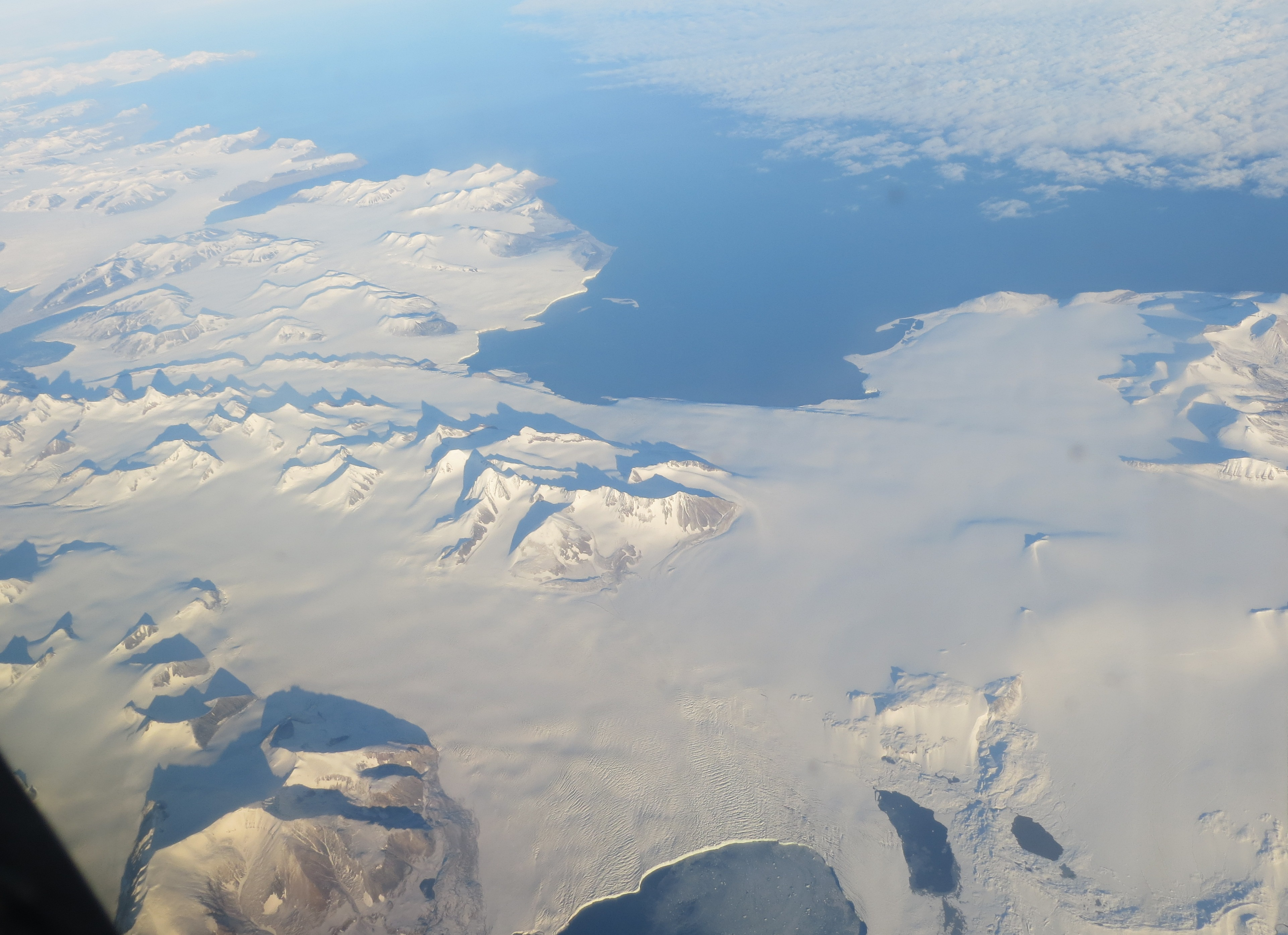
Aerial photo, from the west towards east, of the Sørkapp Land southernmost parts of Spitsbergen, Svalbard.

Brazybreen is a glacier in Sørkapp Land at Spitsbergen, Svalbard. It has a length of about two kilometers, and is located north of Sørkappfonna, between Guilbaudtoppen and Roaldryggen. The glacier is named after Gilbert Georges Paul Brazy.
