= Olsokneset =

Headland in Spitsbergen, Svalbard

Coordinates: 76.668°N 16.274°E

Olsokneset is a headland in Sørkapp Land at Spitsbergen, Svalbard. It is located at the western shore of Spitsbergen, at the southern front of Olsokbreen. The bay of Stormbukta extends from Olsokneset northwards to Bjørnbeinflya.
