= Randbreen =

Glacier in Svalbard, Norway

Coordinates: 76.7185°N 17.0509°E

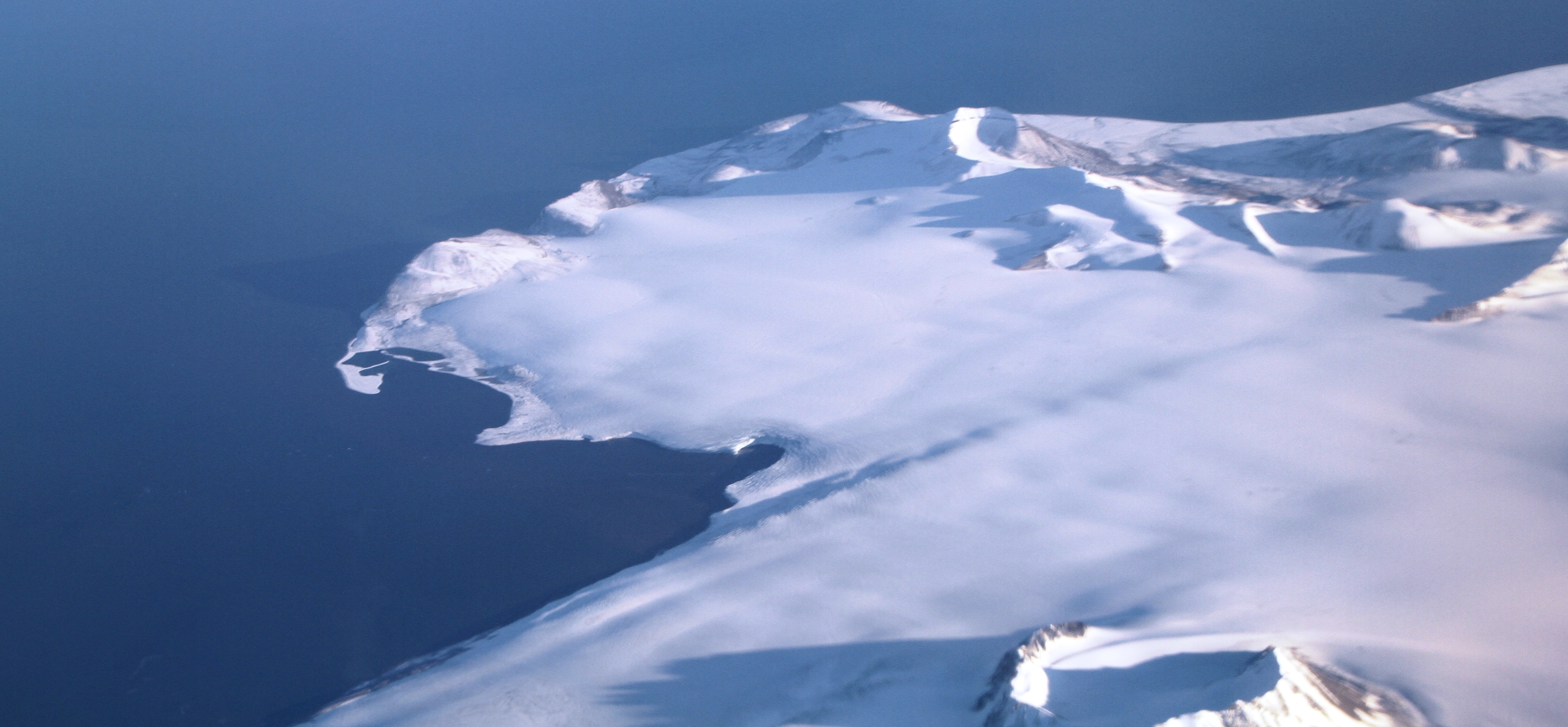

Randbreen ("The Border Glacier") is a glacier in Sørkapp Land at Spitsbergen, Svalbard. It has a length of about three kilometers, and constitutes the southern part of the glacier Vasil'evbreen. It is located north of the mountain Dumskolten, and debouches towards the sea south of Søre Randberget.
