= Bettybukta =

Bay in Svalbard, Norway

Coordinates: 76.6680°N 17.0723°E

Bettybukta is a bay in Sørkapp Land at Spitsbergen, Svalbard. It is located between the glacier Keilhaubreen and Dumskolten. The bay is named after a Swedish vessel. The coastal plain Skoltsletta is located along the northern shore of the bay.
