= Lidfjellet =

Mountain in Svalbard

Coordinates: 76.8644°N 15.7593°E

Lidfjellet is a mountain in Sørkapp Land at Spitsbergen, Svalbard. It is the most southern mountain of Struvefjella, and has a height of 534 m.a.s.l. It is separated from Sergeevfjellet by the mountain pass Sergeevskaret. North of the mountain is the mountain pass Lidpasset, with the valley Lisbetdalen running down to the northwest, and Liddalen down to the south, between Lidfjellet and Gavrilovfjellet. Lidfjellet is named after Norwegian botanist Johannes Lid.
