= Lidelva =

River of Spitsbergen, Norway

Coordinates: 76.8393°N 15.7552°E

Lidelva is a river in Sørkapp Land at Spitsbergen, Svalbard. It has a length of about 5.5 kilometers, flowing through the valley of Liddalen, and further across the plain of Breinesflya. The river is named after Norwegian botanist Johannes Lid.
