= Slaklidalen =

Valley of Spitsbergen, Norway

Coordinates: 76.8528°N 15.8877°E

Slaklidalen is a valley in Sørkapp Land at Spitsbergen, Svalbard. It has a length of about four kilometers, and is located between Gavrilovfjellet and Brevassfjellet at the western side, and Wiederfjellet and Gråkallen at the east side. Slaklielva flows through the valley on its way from Gråkallbreen to Breinesflya.
