= Nordre Randberget =

Mountain in Svalbard, Norway

- Location within Svalbard

Highest point
- Elevation: 305 m (1,001 ft)
- Coordinates: 76.7531°N 17.0632°E

Geography
- Location: Sørkapp Land, Spitsbergen, Svalbard

Nordre Randberget is a mountain in Sørkapp Land at Spitsbergen, Svalbard. It has a height of 305 m.a.s.l., and is located south of Vasil'evbreen and Isbukta.
