= Hohenloheskaret =

Mountain pass in Svalbard, Norway

Coordinates: 76.8870°N 15.6448°E

Hohenloheskaret is a mountain pass in Sørkapp Land at Spitsbergen, Svalbard. It is the most northern mountain pass in the Struvefjella range, and separates the mountain Sergeevfjellet from Hohenlohefjellet. Hohenloheskaret is named after Austrian prince Konstantin Hohenlohe-Schillingsfürst.
