= Vinda =

Vinda may refer to:

Places and jurisdictions

- Vinda (see), an Ancient city, former bishopric and present Latin Catholic titular see in modern Tunisia
- Vinda (Svalbard), a river in Norway
- Vinda, the Hungarian name for Ghinda village, Bistriţa city, Bistriţa-Năsăud County, Romania

Other uses

- Vinda International, a Chinese paper company
- P.G. Vinda, Indian cinematographer
- Vinda Karandikar (1918–2010), Indian poet and writer
