= Brevassfjellet =

Mountain in Spitsbergen, Norway

Coordinates: 76.880°N 15.924°E

Brevassfjellet is a mountain in Sørkapp Land at Spitsbergen, Svalbard. It has a height of 589 m.a.s.l., and is located between Portbreen and Kovalevskajafjellet, south of the ice-dammed lake of Goësvatnet. To the south of the mountain is the valley of Slaklidalen.
