= Bungeelva =

River of Spitsbergen, Norway

Coordinates: 76.7469°N 16.0834°E

Bungeelva is a river in Sørkapp Land at Spitsbergen, Svalbard. It flows from the lake Bungevatnet towards the sea, passing between Tørrflya and Bungeleira and the front of the glacier Vitkovskijbreen. The river is named after Russian Arctic explorer Alexandr Alexandrovich Bunge.
