= René Guilbaud =

French military aviator

- Born: René Guilbaud; 8 October 1890; Mouchamps, France
- Disappeared: 18 June 1928 (aged 37); Barents Sea
- Known for: Disappeared in 1928 while assisting the search for the airship Italia in the Arctic
- Aviation career
- Famous flights: Long-distance expeditionary flight across Africa in late 1926; Long range flight through Africa and the Mediterranean between 12 October 1927 and 9 March 1927

René Guilbaud (8 October 1890 – disappeared 18 June 1928) was an early 20th-century French military aviator.

== Long-distance flights ==
Guilbaud was celebrated mainly for long-range flights, by flying boat across Africa in 1926 and 1927, first in a Lioré et Olivier LeO H-190 and then in a CAMS 37.

== Disappearance ==
Guilbaud disappeared in the Barents Sea en route to Spitsbergen in June 1928, while piloting a Latham 47 flying boat in which Roald Amundsen was travelling to join the search for survivors of the crash of the airship Italia.

While debris from his aircraft was subsequently located by late August, no trace has ever been found of the occupants.

== Legacy ==
The mountain Guilbaudtoppen in Sørkapp Land, Spitsbergen (Svalbard), is named after him.

== See also ==
- List of people who disappeared mysteriously at sea

== Books ==
- La vie héroïque de René Guilbaud 1890-1928 - Coindreau (Roger), 1958
