= Skoltsletta =

Coastal plain of Spitsbergen, Norway

Coordinates: 76.6802°N 17.0540°E

Skoltsletta is a coastal plain in Sørkapp Land at Spitsbergen, Svalbard. It has a length of about four kilometers, and is located along the northern shore of the bay Bettybukta, southeast of Dumskolten and northeast of Svartkuven.
