= Raksodden =

Headland in Spitsbergen, Svalbard

Coordinates: 76.8478°N 15.6180°E

Raksodden (The Rock Point) is a headland at the western coast of Sørkapp Land at Spitsbergen, Svalbard. It has an extension of about 700 meters, and is located between the bays of Bjørnskaubukta and Vestvika. The coastal plain of Breinesflya extends southwards from Raksodden. The Camp Erna was established by a trapper at Raksodden in 1919, when a house was built at the site.
