= Valettebreen =

Glacier in Svalbard

Coordinates: 76.7704°N 16.5801°E

Valettebreen is a glacier in Sørkapp Land on Spitsbergen, Svalbard. It is about two kilometers long, and is located between Guilbaudtoppen and Haitanna.

The glacier is named after Emile Valette, the French radio operator on Amundsen's ill-fated rescue expedition for the lost Airship Italia.
