= Goësvatnet =

Lake at Spitsbergen, Svalbard

Coordinates: 76°54′16″N 15°52′04″E

- Location in Svalbard
- Location: Sørkapp Land at Spitsbergen, Svalbard
- Type: natural freshwater lake
- Basin countries: Norway

Goësvatnet is an ice-dammed lake in Sørkapp Land at Spitsbergen, Svalbard. It is located south of the bay of Gåshamna in Hornsund, at the front of Goësbreen and near Brevassfjellet. The lake is named after Swedish surgeon and zoologist Axel Theodor Goës.
