= Slaklielva =

River in Norway

Coordinates: 76.8469°N 15.8617°E

Slaklielva is a river in northwestern Sørkapp Land at Spitsbergen, Svalbard. The river flows from Gråkallbreen through Slaklidalen and across Breinesflya at the western coast.
