= Morenetangen =

Headland in Spitsbergen, Svalbard

Coordinates: 76.8325°N 16.9611°E

Morenetangen ("The Moraine Spit") is a headland in Sørkapp Land at Spitsbergen, Svalbard. It is located at the northern side of the bay of Isbukta, at the eastern coast of Spitsbergen.
