= Gråkallbreen =

Glacier in Svalbard, Norway

Coordinates: 76.8724°N 15.9350°E

Gråkallbreen is a glacier in Sørkapp Land at Spitsbergen, Svalbard. It has a length of about 800 meters, and is located north of the mountain Gråkallen and in the upper part of Slaklidalen. Slaklielva originates from Gråkallbreen and flows through Slaklidalen and across Breinesflya towards the sea.
