= Sergeevfjellet =

Mountain in Svalbard

Coordinates: 76.8770°N 15.6768°E

Sergeevfjellet is a mountain in Sørkapp Land at Spitsbergen, Svalbard. It has a height of 433 m.a.s.l., and is part of Struvefjella. It is separated from Hohenlohefjellet to the north by the mountain pass Hohenloheskaret, and from Lidfjellet to the south by the mountain pass Sergeevskaret. Sergeevfjellet is named after A. M. Sergeev, participant at the Swedish-Russian Arc-of-Meridian Expedition.
