= Guilbaudtoppen =

Mountain in Svalbard, Norway

Coordinates: 76.7636°N 16.5907°E

Guilbaudtoppen is a mountain in Sørkapp Land at Spitsbergen, Svalbard. It has a height of 675 m.a.s.l. and is located east of the glacier of Olsokbreen, between Valettebreen and Brazybreen. The mountain is named after French pilot René Guilbaud
