= Sergeevskaret =

Coordinates: 76.8712°N 15.7295°E

Sergeevskaret is a mountain pass in Sørkapp Land at Spitsbergen, Svalbard. It separates Sergeevfjellet from Lidfjellet to the south. Sergeevskaret is named after A. M. Sergeev, participant in the Swedish-Russian Arc-of-Meridian Expedition.
