= Isbukta =

Bay in Svalbard, Norway

Coordinates: 76.8008°N 16.9224°E

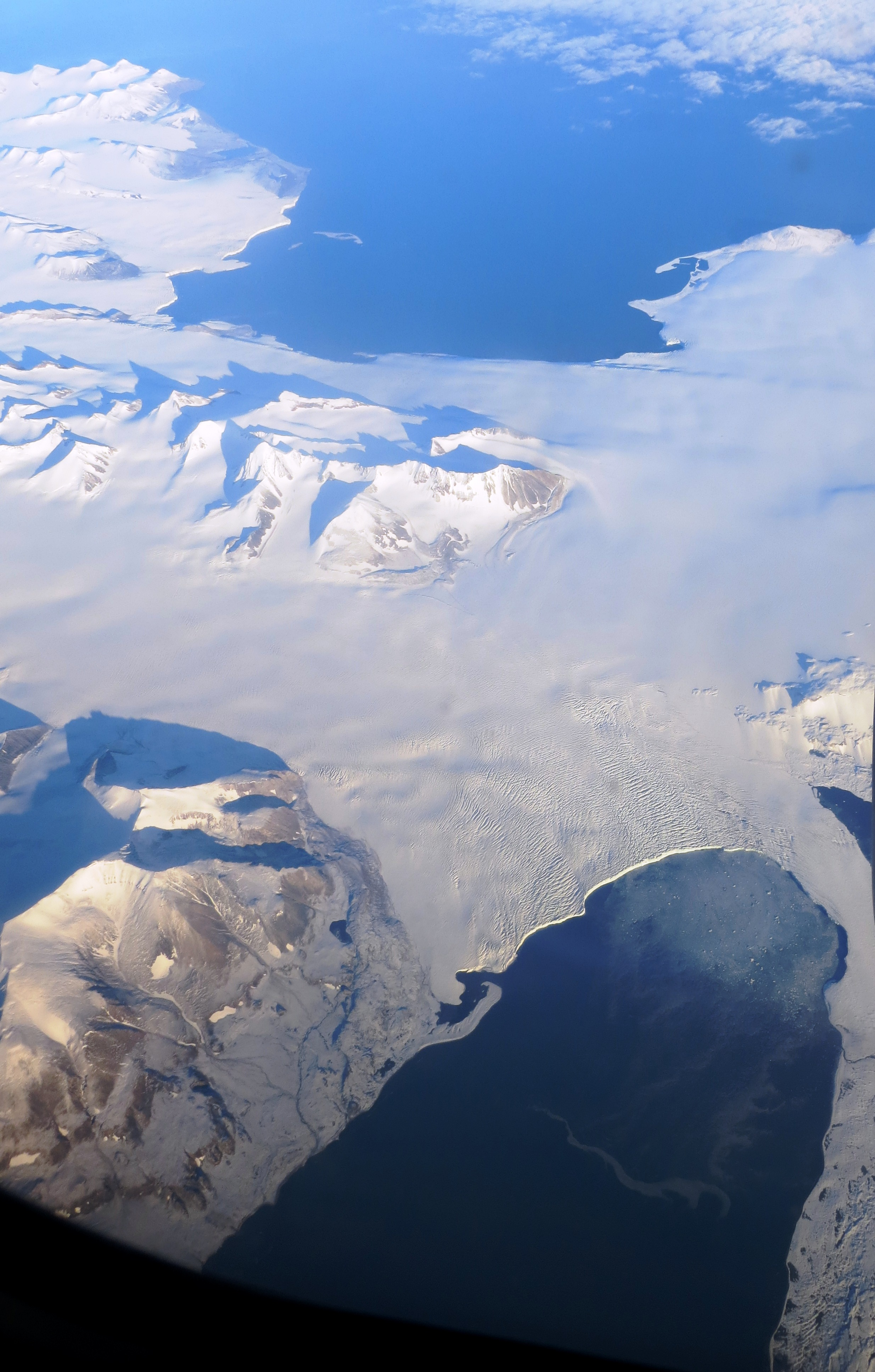
View across Sørkapp Land from west, with Isbukta in the background. In the front is Stormbukta.

Isbukta is a bay in Sørkapp Land at Spitsbergen, Svalbard. It is located at the eastern shore of Spitsbergen, extending between Morenetangen and Nordre Randberget. The glacier Vasil'evbreen debouches into the bay from north, and Sørkappfonna debouches into the bay from the south.
