= Bjørnbeinflya =

Coastal plain of Spitsbergen, Norway

Coordinates: 76.7183°N 16.1999°E

Bjørnbeinflya is a coastal plain in Sørkapp Land at Spitsbergen, Svalbard. It is located at the southwestern shore of Spitsbergen, northwest of the bay Stormbukta, between Olsokflya and Vitkovskijbreen. The headland Fisneset separates Bjørnbeinflya from Olsokflya. Further northwest along the shore is the plain Tørrflya.
