= Roaldryggen =

Mountain ridge in Svalbard, Norway

Coordinates: 76.7606°N 16.6346°E

Roaldryggen is a mountain ridge in Sørkapp Land at Spitsbergen, Svalbard. It has a length of about 3.5 kilometers, and is located southwest of Vasil'evbreen. The highest peak on the ridge is 730 m.a.s.l. The ridge is named after polar explorer Roald Amundsen.
