= Olsokflya =

Coastal plain of Spitsbergen, Norway

Coordinates: 76.7137°N 16.2803°E

Olsokflya is a coastal plain in Sørkapp Land at Spitsbergen, Svalbard. It is located at southwestern coast of Spitsbergen, between the moraine of Olsokbreen to the southeast and Bjørnbeinflya to the northwest.
