= Haitanna =

Mountain in Svalbard, Norway

Coordinates: 76.7815°N 16.6019°E

Haitanna is a mountain in Sørkapp Land at Spitsbergen, Svalbard. It has a height of 932 m.a.s.l., and is located between the glaciers Vasil'evbreen and Olsokbreen. The peak has a distinctive shape, and is visible from the sea.
