= Lioré et Olivier LeO H-190 =

H-190
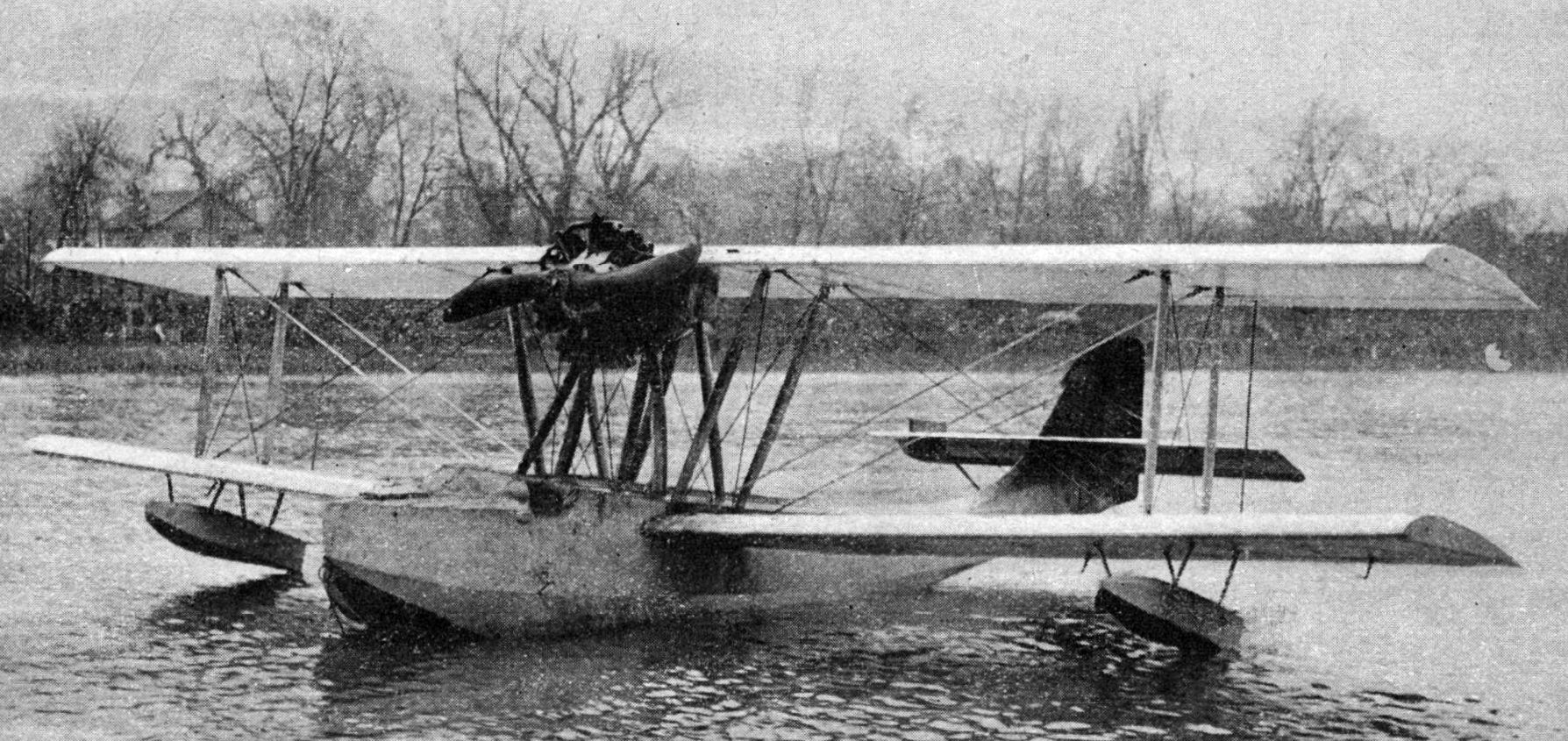
- H-194

General information
- Type: Amphibian airliner
- National origin: France
- Manufacturer: Lioré et Olivier
- Number built: 45

History
- First flight: 1926

The Lioré et Olivier H-190 was a biplane flying boat aircraft designed and produced by the French aircraft manufacturer Lioré et Olivier.

Developed as a passenger transport, various versions of the H-190 were also developed, including catapult-ready mail planes intended to be launched from transatlantic ocean liners and coastal patrol aircraft.

The sole LeO H-194 was flown by Marc Bernard together with a CAMS 37 flown by René Guilbaud in a long-distance expeditionary flight across Africa in late 1926. They covered 28,000 km (17,000 mi) in three months, covering Morocco, Mali, Nigeria, Belgian Congo, Mozambique and Madagascar.

== Design ==
The Lioré et Olivier H-190 was a single-bay biplane flying boat with un-staggered wings and powered by a single engine that was mounted tractor-fashion underneath the upper wing and supported on struts in the interplane gap. While early-built aircraft had the pilot's open cockpit located aft of the wing, later-built aircraft had the pilot's cockpit relocated forward of the wing. The lines of the hull were designed around the desired marine qualities of the flying boat; it proved itself to handle well when subjected to five-foot waves. To maintain the hull's condition, regular applications of ordinary boat paint were required. While the flying boat's duralumin elements proved fairly durable, its steel fittings were not so long-living, despite the application of a protective baked enamel.

Its construction was conventional for the era and harnessed techniques previously used by the company on earlier seaplanes. The fuselage was composed entirely of wood, a large proportion of the framework, including the keel, chines, upper longerons and the majority of the transverse frames, were made from ash, while the deck beams consisted of four thicknesses of ash and spruce that were glued together. The submerged portion of the fuselage was entire1y covered with either a double or triple boarding of Cuban mahogany, upon which a protective layer of bituminous dope was applied. The portion above the waterline was covered with birch plywood instead, which had a special filler applied to it to absorb ultraviolet light and thus better preserve the condition of the wood. Underneath the propeller, the hull was reinforced by sheet metal as well as by a series of compact longitudinal strips, which assisted the crew in not slipping on the hull's rounded edge.

The box spars were composed of spruce and plywood while the ribs had plywood webs and spruce flanges. The drag wires were piano wires that terminated in fastenings, the design of which was both patented and officially approved. The ties and wing bracing consisted of duralumin tubes while the flying wires consisted of a pair of piano wires held together by a fairing. The landing wires were streamlined and used Chobert fastenings. The floats were attached to the wing via four compact duralumin struts and consisted of a framework of ash that was covered by birch plywood. The wing covering was doped fabric. Washers were typically used in conjunction with rivets. The tail unit consisted of a primary fin accompanied by two auxiliary fins, one above and one below the stabilizer, which was secured by a pair of duralumin struts and bracing wires. The ailerons, elevator, and rudder all had welded steel frames and fabric coverings.

The flying boat was typically powered by a Gnome et Rhône 9Ad Jupiter air-cooled radial engine, capable of generating up to 420 HP. The engine nacelle contained a supporting frame that was attached via four bolts to the spars of the upper wing and to the struts of the cabane; the nacelle itself was positioned between the two spars and consists of a steel-tubing framework enclosed in an aluminium cowling. Various elements were contained within this cowling, including a pair of fuel pumps, a fire extinguisher, oil radiator, oil sump and tank, as well as several sizable ports to ease inspection and servicing alike. A relatively robust propeller, composed of treated beechwood and partially covered by copper, was typically fitted; a spare propeller was also often carried.

A cartridge ignition arrangement was used to start the engine; engine-related instrumentation included an oil-pressure indicator, a revolution counter, aero-thermometer, multiple fuel gauges, and a fuel regulator. General instrumentation included a drift meter, altimeter, inclinometer, and a pair of compasses; some aircraft were outfitted with 12-volt generators to power apparatus such as cameras. Fuel was housed within the fuselage across a total of six tanks composed of duralumin tanks, each having a capacity of 235 liters (7.36 gallons) and weighing only nine kg (roughly 20 lb.), while the fuel pipes were made of aluminium. Oil was stored in two locations, a 20-liter (21-gallon) tank in the hull and a 35-liter (9.2-gallon) gravity tank in the engine nacelle; a hand pump was used to transfer oil from the former to the latter. Anchoring was aided by the presence of a two-part hatch in the upper surface of the forward deck; baggage was held within a separate compartment just aft of the rear-most pair of fuel tanks.

== Variants ==
H-190T
("Transport") - airliner powered by a 310 kW (420 hp) Gnome-Rhône 9Ab Jupiter engine; (five built).
H-191
trainer powered by a 340 kW (450 hp) Lorraine 12Eb; (one built).
H-192
airliner similar to H-190T, but with cockpit in new position, powered by a 310 kW (420 hp) Gnome-Rhône 9Ab Jupiter; (2 built).
H-193
similar to H-192, but with reinforced wing, powered by a 310 kW (420 hp) Gnome & Rhône 9Ady; (five built).
H-193S
(S - "Surveillance") - maritime patrol version of H-193, powered by a 310 kW (420 hp) Gnome-Rhône 9Ad Jupiter; (15 built).
H-193HS
H-193S with a 370 kW (500 hp) Hispano-Suiza 12Mb engine; (one converted).
H-194
version for long-distance flight, powered by a 310 kW (420 hp) Gnome-Rhône 9Ab Jupiter; (one built).
H-195
H-196
similar to H-193, powered by a 310 kW (420 hp) Gnome-Rhône 9Ab Jupiter; (one built).
H-197S
(Sanitaire) - air ambulance version of H-193, powered by a 310 kW (420 hp) Gnome-Rhône 9Adz Jupiter; (one built).
H-198
catapult-capable mailplane, powered by a 310 kW (420 hp) Gnome-Rhône 9Af Jupiter; (nine built).
H-198/2
catapult-capable airliner with a 370 kW (500 hp) Renault 12Ja engine; (three built).
H-199/1
twin-engine version, with second engine mounted in pusher-fashion in tandem with the first: examples with 2x 170 kW (230 hp) Hispano-Suiza 6Mbr; (one built).
H-199/2
twin-engine version, with second engine mounted in pusher-fashion in tandem with the first: 2x 260 kW (350 hp) Gnome-Rhône 7Kb engines; (one built).

== Operators ==
France

- French Navy

== Specifications (H-193S) ==
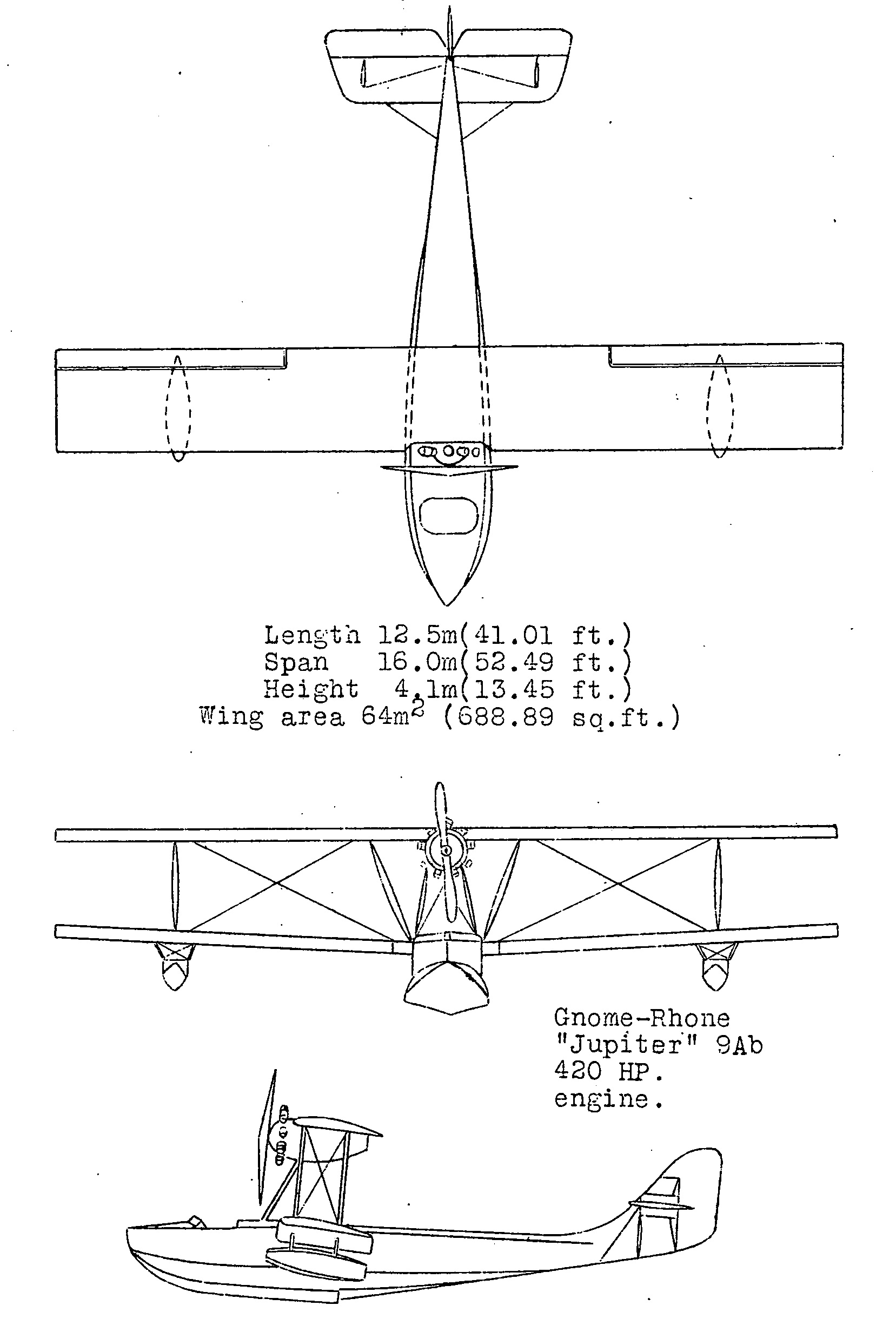
Loire et Olivier H-194 3-view drawing from NACA Aircraft Circular No.39

Data from Jane's all the World's Aircraft 1928

General characteristics

- Crew: 6/7 (minimum 3)
- Length: 12.5 m (41 ft 0 in)
- Wingspan: 16.3 m (53 ft 6 in)
- Height: 4.17 m (13 ft 8 in)
- Wing area: 64 m^{2} (690 sq ft)
- Empty weight: 1,750 kg (3,858 lb)
- Gross weight: 3,150 kg (6,945 lb)
- Powerplant: 1 × Gnome et Rhône 9Ad Jupiter Nine-cylinder air-cooled radial piston engine, 310 kW (420 hp)
- Propellers: 2-bladed wooden fixed pitch propeller

Performance

- Maximum speed: 170 km/h (110 mph, 92 kn)
- Range: 620 km (390 mi, 330 nmi)
- Wing loading: 49.2 kg/m^{2} (10.1 lb/sq ft)
- Power/mass: 0.0606 hp/lb (0.0996 kW/kg)

Armament

- Guns: 4x 7.7 mm (0.30 in) Lewis machine-guns on twin flexible mounts in front and rear gunner's compartments

== Bibliography ==
- "Liore-Olivier LeO 194 seaplane" National Advisory Committee for Aeronautics, 1 April 1917. NACA-AC-39, 93R19905.
