= Hohenlohefjellet =

Coordinates: 76.8950°N 15.6270°E

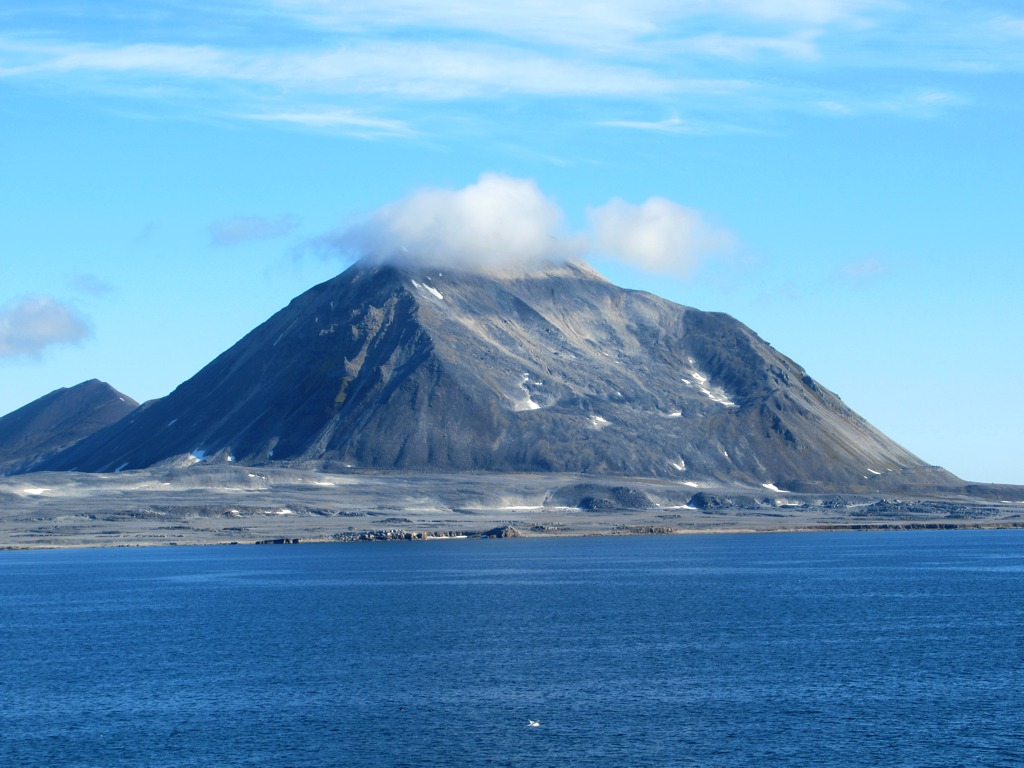
Hohenlohefjellet

Hohenlohefjellet is a mountain in Sørkapp Land at Spitsbergen, Svalbard. It is the highest and most northern summit of Struvefjella, with a height of 616 m.a.s.l. It is separated from Sergeevfjellet by the mountain pass Hohenloheskaret. Hohenlohefjellet is named after Austrian prince Konstantin Hohenlohe-Schillingsfürst. The mountain has a saddle shaped appearance, and is a characteristic sailing mark.
