= Tørrflya =

Coastal plain of Spitsbergen, Norway

Coordinates: 76.7563°N 15.9847°E

Tørrflya (The Dry Plain) is a coastal plain in Sørkapp Land at Spitsbergen, Svalbard. It has a length of about six kilometers, and is located at the western shore of Spitsbergen, between the rivers of Bungeelva and Vinda. The lake Bungevatnet is located between the plain and moraine deposits from Bungebreen.
