= Hornbreen =

Glacier in Svalbard, Norway

Coordinates: 77°04′12″N 16°42′00″E

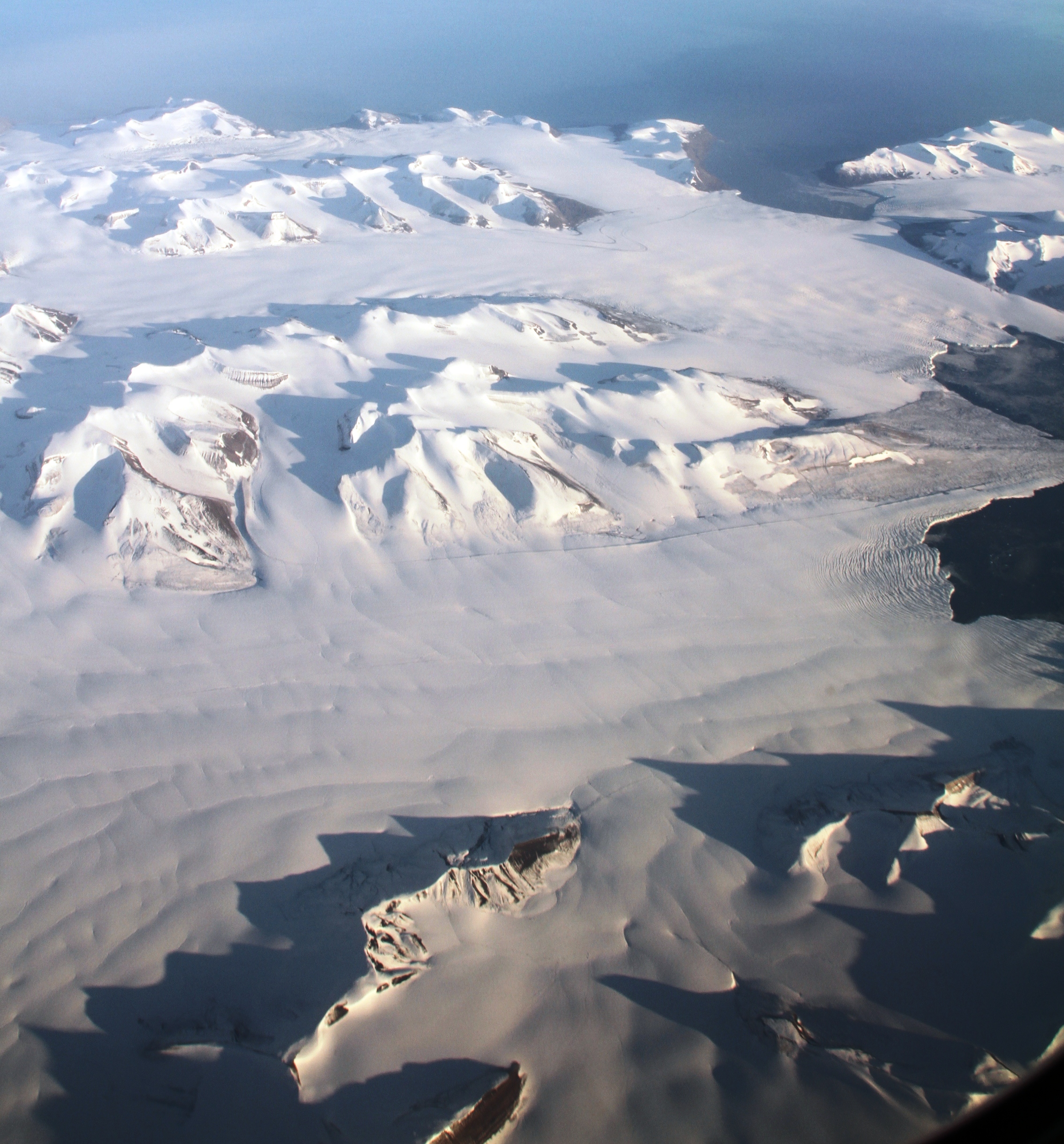
Flatbreen, Hornbreen, Storbreen

Hornbreen ("Horn glacier") lies between Torell Land and Sørkapp Land on Spitsbergen, Svalbard. The glacier debouches into Hornsund. Former names of the glacier include Ramme Gletscher and Horn Glacier. Hornbreen has a length of about 15 km, and width of 8 km.
