= Stormbukta =

Bay in Svalbard, Arctic Ocean

Coordinates: 76.6927°N 16.2863°E

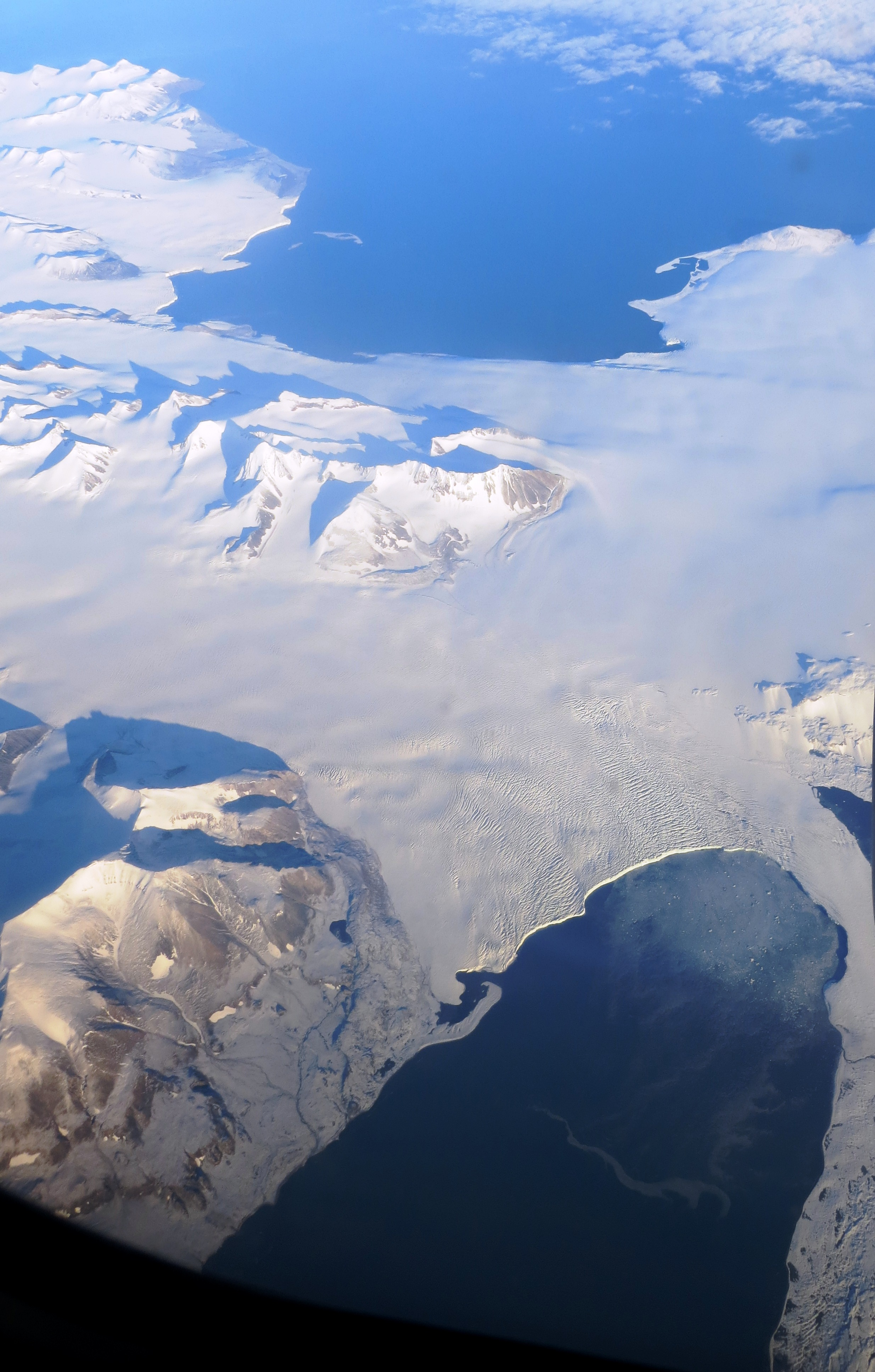
View across Sørkapp Land from west, with Stormbukta at the front (right), and Isbukta in the back.

Stormbukta is a bay in Sørkapp Land at Spitsbergen, Svalbard. It is located at the western shore of Spitsbergen, extending from Olsokneset northwards to Bjørnbeinflya. The bay is named after Arctic explorer Erik Storm. The glaciers Olsokbreen and Sørkappfonna debouch into the bay.
