= CAMS 37 =

Flying boat built in France

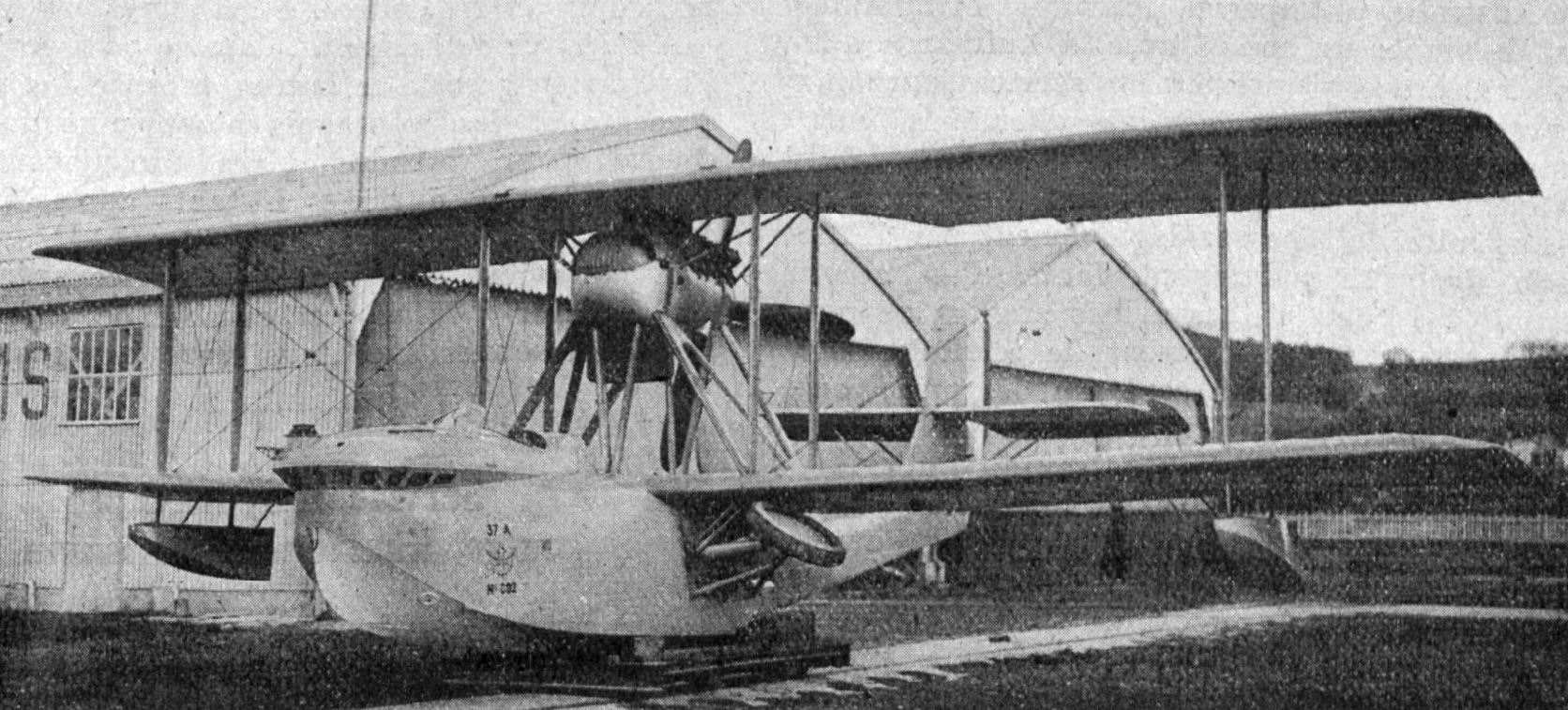

General information
- Type: Reconnaissance flying boat
- Manufacturer: CAMS
- Designer: Maurice Hurel
- Primary user: French Navy
- Number built: 332

History
- Introduction date: 1927
- First flight: 1926
- Retired: 1942

The CAMS 37 was a French 1920s biplane flying boat designed for military reconnaissance, but which found use in a wide variety of roles.

== Development ==
It was the first design for Chantiers Aéro-Maritimes de la Seine (CAMS) by their new head designer, Maurice Hurel. The prototype was displayed at the 1926 Salon de l'Aéronautique in Paris and first flew the same year. After testing was ordered into service before the end of the year. It was a conventional biplane flying boat very similar to previous CAMS designs, being driven by a pusher propeller whose engine was mounted on struts in the interplane gap. The first production version was the amphibious CAMS 37A that was bought by the French Navy, the Portuguese Navy and the aeroclub of Martinique.

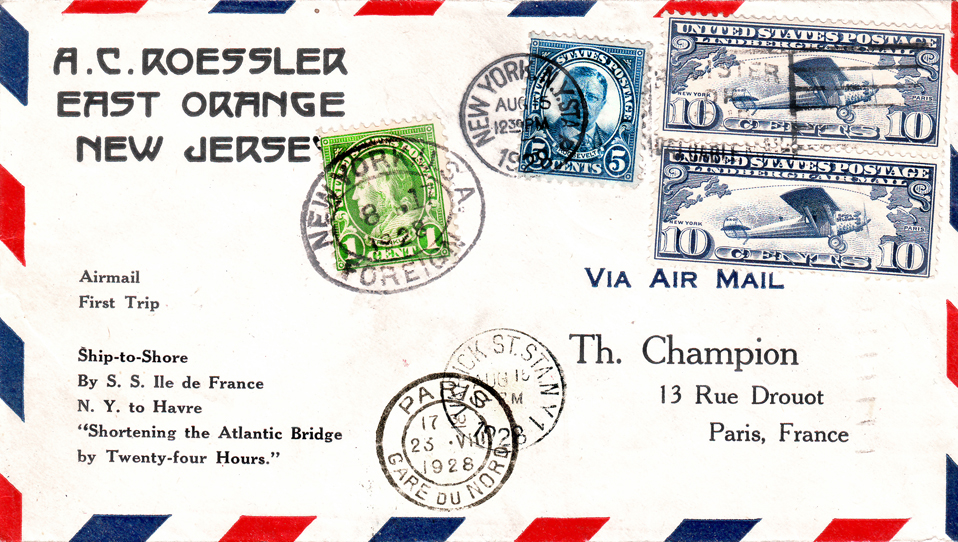
Flown cover carried on the first US to Europe "catapult" air mail from the Ile de France at sea to Paris, August 23, 1928

== Operational history ==
The aircraft operated from every French Naval Air Station and from many capital ships.

Trials were conducted by Compagnie Générale Transatlantique on the SS Île de France to evaluate operating catapult-launched mailplanes from transatlantic liners with two specially-built 37/10s.

René Guilbaud made a long-distance flight over Africa and the Mediterranean between 12 October 1927 and 9 March 1927, venturing as far as Madagascar before returning to Marseille. In the course of the flight, he covered 22,600 km (14,000 mi) in 38 stages without incident.

The CAMS 37 was gradually withdrawn from front line duties in the mid-to-late 1930s, and when World War II started in September 1939, the aircraft had been relegated to training and communication roles. On mobilisation, however, CAMS 37/11 trainers were used by two units for coastal patrol, with one unit, Escadrille 2S2 continuing in service until August 1940. Outside mainland France, CAMS 37/11 trainers continued in use with a Free French unit in Tahiti until 15 January 1941, and with a Vichy France unit in Indochina until 1942

== Variants ==
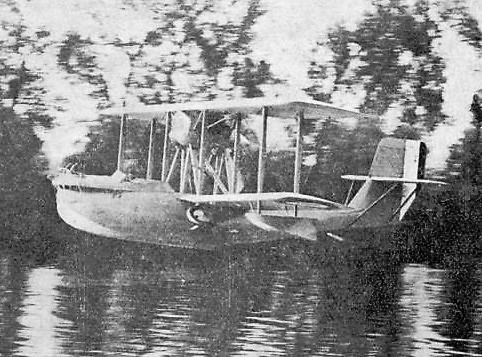
CAMS 37 photo from Annuaire de L'Aéronautique 1931

37
Flying boat prototype, (one built).

37A
amphibious version (185 built).

37/2
pure flying boat version incorporating refinements from 37A amphibian (45 built).

37 A/3
reinforced hull (two built).

37 A/6
enclosed cabin admiral's barge for Aéronavale (three built).

37A/7
(or 37Lia) liaison amphibian (36 built).

37A/9
metal-hulled officer transport for French Navy (4 built).

37/10
version for catapult trials (two built).

37/11
Four-seat liaison / trainer wooden-hulled version (110 built).

37/12
civil version with enclosed four-seat cabin (one built).

37/13
(or 37bis) metal-hulled version for catapult launching from ships.

37GR

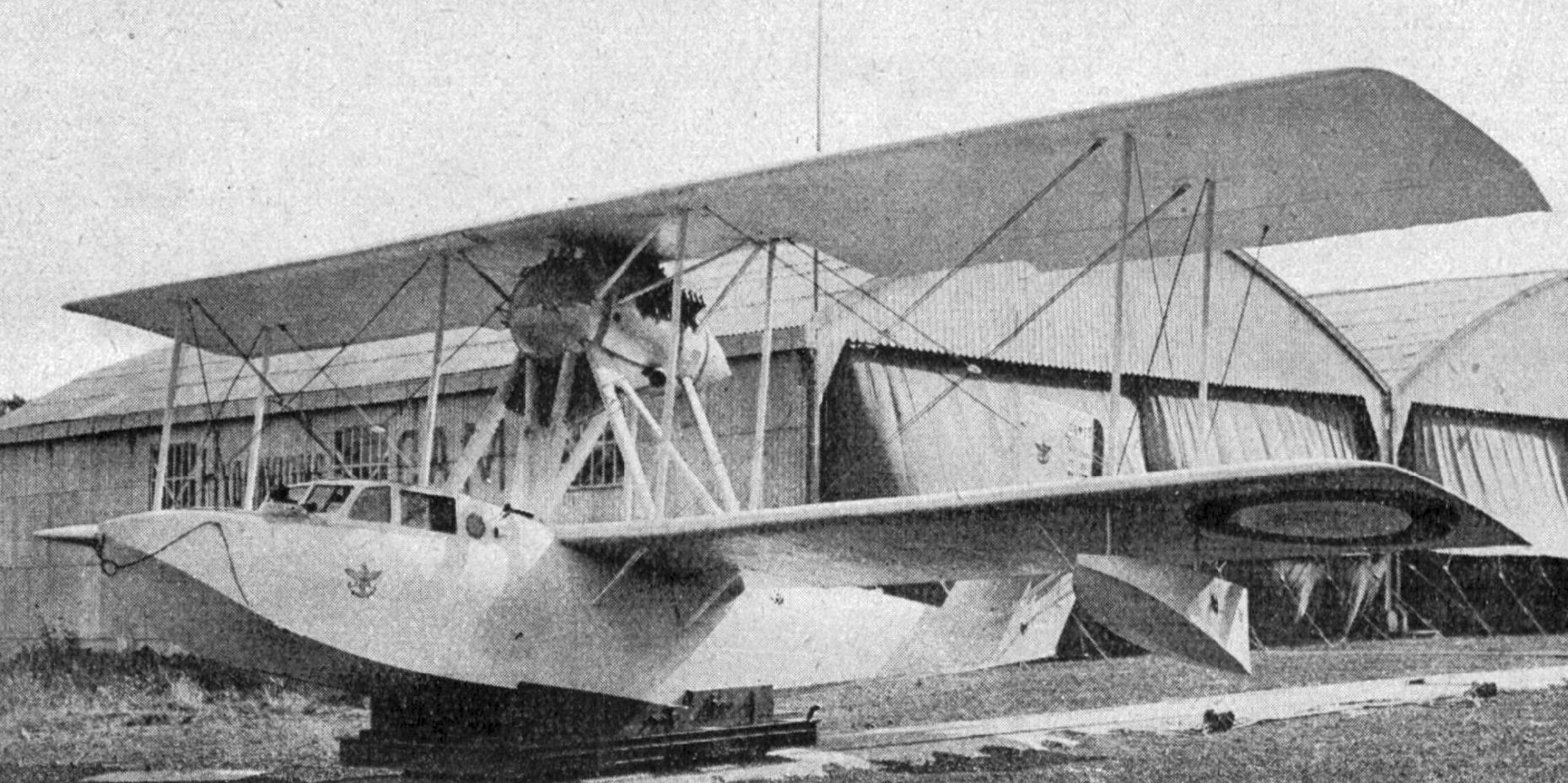
CAMS 37GR photo from L'Aérophile December,1926

(GR – Grand Raids) A single long-range aircraft converted for the 37C prototype, flown by Lieutenant de Vaisseau Guilbaud, from l'Etang de Berre, in the company of Lioré-Olivier LeO H-194 on 12 October 1926, for a proving flight to Madagascar. On 3 January 1927 the engine threw a connecting rod, causing Guilbaud to abandon the Madagascar flight and return to Marseille on 9 March 1927, via Sudan, Egypt, Lebanon, Turkey, Greece, Malta and Tunisia.

37LIA
(a.k.a. 37 A/7) :see above
37C
A single commercial transport prototype, converted to the sole 37GR
37E
(E – ecole) Aéronavale designation for CAMS 37/11
37bis
(a.k.a. 37/13) :see above

== Operators ==
France

- Aviation Navale
- French Air Force

Vichy France

- Vichy French Air Force

Portugal

- Portuguese Naval Aviation

== Specifications (37/2) ==
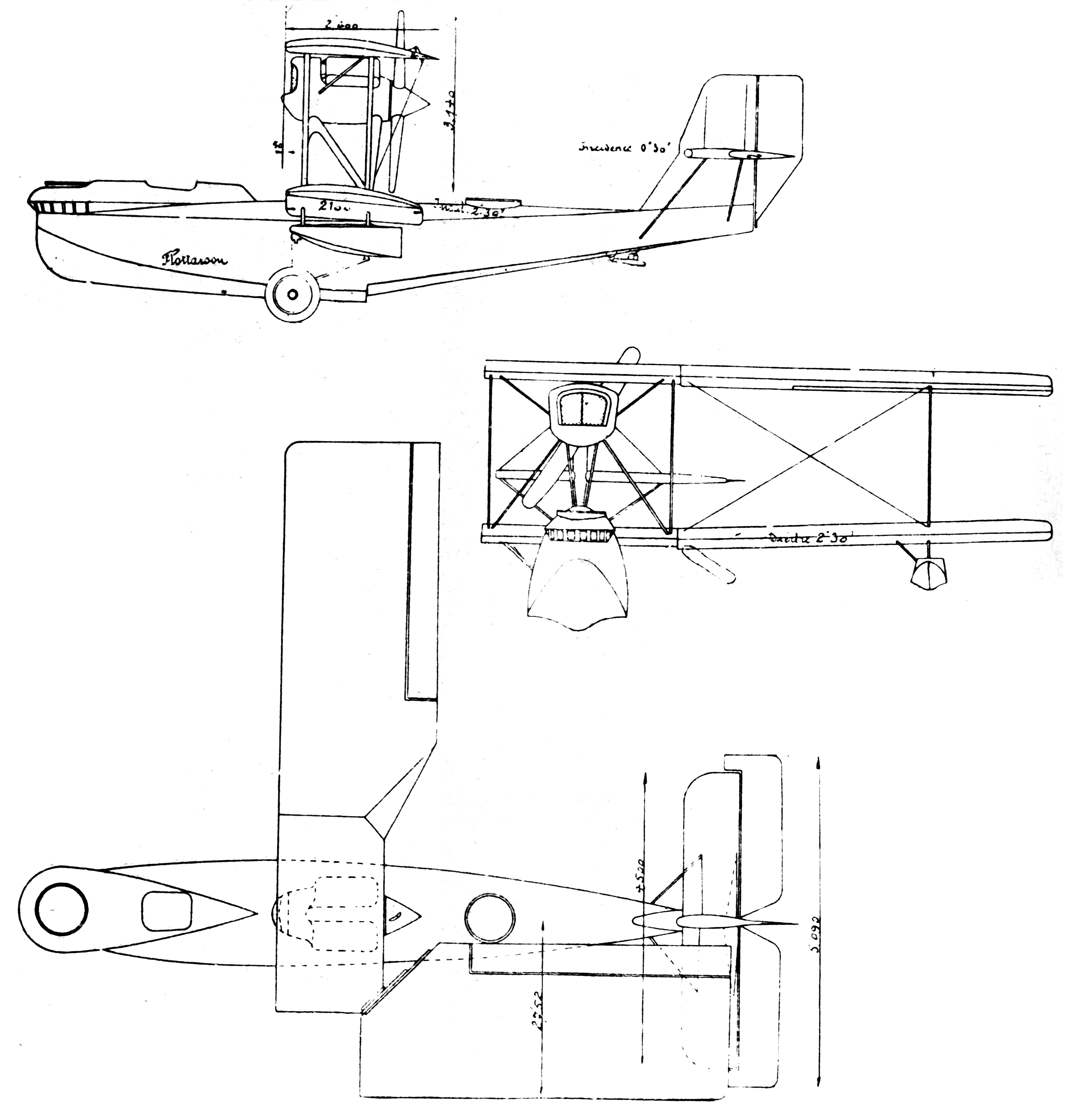
CAMS 37A 3-view drawing from L'Air October 1,1927

Data from Jane's all the World's Aircraft 1928, Aviafrance, CAMS 37A

General characteristics

- Crew: Three
- Length: 11.432 m (37 ft 6 in)
- Wingspan: 14.5 m (47 ft 7 in)
- Height: 4.04 m (13 ft 3 in)
- Wing area: 58 m^{2} (620 sq ft)
- Empty weight: 1,950 kg (4,299 lb)
- Gross weight: 2,850 kg (6,283 lb)
- Powerplant: 1 × Lorraine 12Ed Courlis W-12 water-cooled piston engine, 340 kW (450 hp)
- Propellers: 2-bladed fixed pitch propeller

Performance

- Maximum speed: 175 km/h (109 mph, 94 kn)
- Minimum speed: 90 km/h (56 mph; 49 kn) (Note: this is NOT minimum control speed which is only for aircraft with multiple engines)
- Range: 1,200 km (750 mi, 650 nmi)
- Service ceiling: 4,500 m (14,800 ft)
- Time to altitude: 3,000 m (9,800 ft) in 35 minutes
- Wing loading: 49 kg/m^{2} (10 lb/sq ft)
- Power/mass: 0.1182 kW/kg (0.0719 hp/lb)

Armament

- 4 × trainable 7.7 mm (0.303 in) Lewis guns, 2 in bow and 2 behind prop
- 300 kg (660 lb) of bombs carried under lower wing

== See also ==
Aircraft of comparable role, configuration, and era

- CANT 21
- Lioré et Olivier LeO H-190

Related lists

- List of aircraft of World War II
- List of Interwar military aircraft

== Bibliography ==
- Bousquet, Gérard (2013). French Flying Boats of WW II. Sandomierz, Poland: Stratus. ISBN 978-83-63678-06-7.
- Cortet, Pierre (March 1999). "Des C.A.M.S. à coque "metal"" [C.A.M.S. Introduces a Metal Hull]. Avions: Toute l'aéronautique et son histoire (in French) (72): 37–39. ISSN 1243-8650.
- Cortet, Pierre (December 1999). "Courrier des Lecteurs" [Readers' Letters]. Avions: Toute l'aéronautique et son histoire (in French) (81): 4. ISSN 1243-8650.
- Esperou, Robert (April 1994). "Les vols d'essais commerciaux français sur l'Atlantique Nord, de 1928 à 1939" [French commercial test flights over the North Atlantic, 1928 to 1939]. Le Fana de l'Aviation (in French) (293): 40–50. ISSN 0757-4169.
- Morareau, Lucien (June 1998). "Courrier des Lecteurs" [Readers' Letters]. Avions: Toute l'aéronautique et son histoire (in French) (63): 2–3. ISSN 1243-8650.
- Morareau, Lucien (April 1999). "Courrier des Lecteurs" [Readers' Letters]. Avions: Toute l'aéronautique et son histoire (in French) (73): 2–3. ISSN 1243-8650.
- Morareau, Lucien (December 1998). "L'escadrille du bout du monde" [Squadron at the End of the World]. Avions: Toute l'aéronautique et son histoire (in French) (69): 42–51. ISSN 1243-8650.
- Morareau, Lucien (January 1999). "Des CAMS sur le Pacifique: L'escadrille du bout du monde (fin)" [The CAMS over the Pacific: Squadron at the End of the World]. Avions: Toute l'aéronautique et son histoire (in French) (70): 45–53. ISSN 1243-8650.
