= Frederik Casparus Wieder =

Dutch cartographer, historian and librarian (1874-1943)

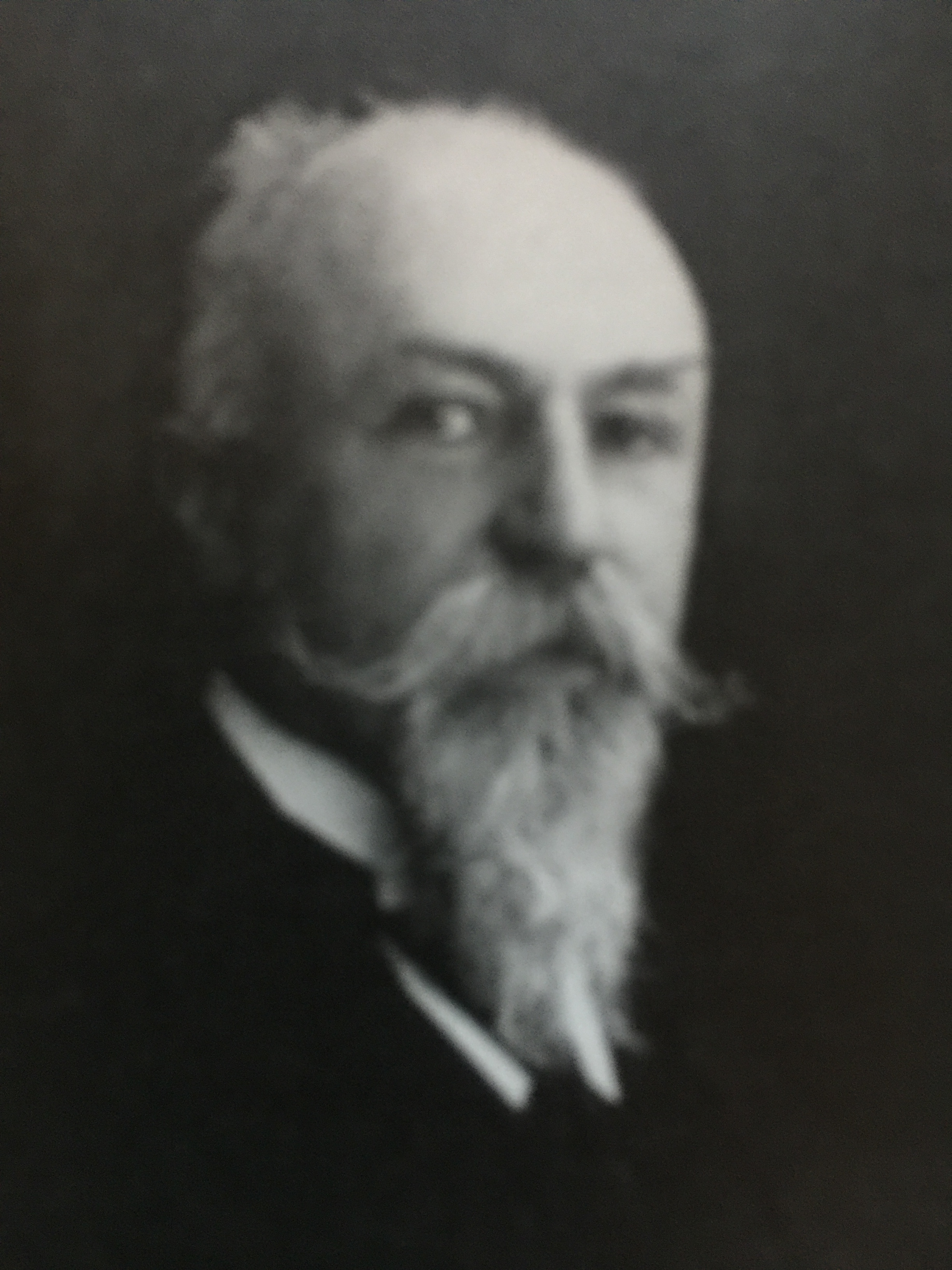
- Frederik Casparus Wieder
- Born: 23 November 1874; Mijnsheerenland, Netherlands
- Died: 7 January 1943 (aged 68); Noordwijk, Netherlands
- Education: University of Amsterdam
- Occupations: Antiquarian, cartographer, historian, librarian
- Writing career
- Notable works: De Schriftuurlijke liedekens, de liederen der Nederlandsche hervormden tot op het jaar 1566, thesis 1900, and Monumenta cartographica : reproductions of unique and rare maps, plans and views in the actual size of the originals accompanied by cartographical monographs, 1925–1933.

Frederik Casparus Wieder (23 November 1874, Mijnsheerenland – 7 January 1943, Noordwijk) was a Dutch cartographer, historian and librarian.

== Education and career ==
The son of a Protestant minister, Wieder studied Dutch letters at the University of Amsterdam, where he also won a doctorate cum laude in 1900 on his thesis De Schriftuurlijke liedekens, de liederen der Nederlandsche hervormden tot op het jaar 1566 on Protestant songs from the Dutch Reformation before 1566. Then he turned to working as an antiquarian with Frederik Muller in Amsterdam, from 1902 up to 1912, when he took up the position of assistant librarian at his university. In 1917 he became the librarian of the Rijks Hoogere Land-, Tuin- en Boschbouwschool (the later Wageningen University) to expand the collection there.

At the request of the American architect Isaac Newton Phelps Stokes Wieder researched early maps of Manhattan, New Amsterdam and New York, which led to their co-written book The iconography of Manhattan island, 1498-1909 (New York, 1915-1928). To support the Dutch claim to the sovereignty of the Svalbard archipelago, then called Spitsbergen and discovered by Willem Barentsz in 1596, the Dutch Ministry of Foreign Affairs commissioned a report by Wieder, which was published in 1919. (Nevertheless, the Svalbard Treaty of 1920 awarded the islands to Norway.)

In 1924 he was appointed librarian of Leiden University, where he stayed on until 1938, when he resigned due to an unspecified conflict with the curators. He promoted a "mobile systematic catalogue", with most frequently used books easily accessible in open stacks that would become standard only around 1970 in academic libraries. To facilitate research, he published high-quality facsimiles of historical maps, for instance in his Monumenta cartographica (1925-1933) and, together with and paid for by the Egyptian prince Youssouf Kamal (Yūsuf Kamāl), Monumenta geographica Africae et Aegypti (1926-1953) in sixteen volumes. His last publication was the 1644 map of the discovery of Tasmania by Abel Tasman, the most important historical Dutch map according to Wieder.

Wieder was succeeded as Leiden university librarian by Tietse Pieter Sevensma, after a six months interlude with Jan de Vries as acting librarian.

== Geography named after Wieder ==
- Wiederbreen on Svalbard.
- Wiederfjellet, likewise at Svalbard.

== Publications ==
Wieder's publications include:

- Wieder, F.C. (1900). De Schriftuurlijke liedekens, de liederen der Nederlandsche hervormden tot op het jaar 1566. Inhoudsbeschrijving en bibliographie (in Dutch). 's-Gravenhage: M. Nijhoff. OCLC 459001818.
- Phelps Stokes, I.N.; Wieder, F.C. (1915–1928). The Iconography of Manhattan Island, 1498-1909 : compiled from original sources and illustrated by photo-intaglio reproductions of important maps, plans, views, and documents in public and private collections. New York: Robert.H. Dodd. OCLC 905765912. Six volumes.
- Wieder, F.C. (1919). The Dutch Discovery and Mapping of Spitsbergen (1596-1829). The Hague, Amsterdam: Nijhoff, The Netherland Ministry of Foreign Affairs and The Royal Dutch Geographical Society. OCLC 64900411.
- Wieder, F.C. (1923). De reis van Mahu en de Cordes door de Straat van Magalhaes naar Zuid-Amerika en Japan, 1598-1600. Deel I. (in Dutch). Den Haag: Martinus Nijhoff.
- Wieder, F.C. (1924). De reis van Mahu en de Cordes door de Straat van Magalhaes naar Zuid-Amerika en Japan, 1598-1600. Deel II (in Dutch). Den Haag: Martinus Nijhoff.
- Wieder, F.C. (1925). De reis van Mahu en de Cordes door de Straat van Magalhaes naar Zuid-Amerika en Japan, 1598-1600. Deel III (in Dutch). Den Haag: Martinus Nijhoff.
- Wieder, F.C. (1925). De stichting van New York in juli 1625 (in Dutch). Den Haag: Martinus Nijhoff.
- Wieder, F.C. (1925–1933). Monumenta cartographica : reproductions of unique and rare maps, plans and views in the actual size of the originals accompanied by cartographical monographs. The Hague: Nijhoff. OCLC 905292948. Five volumes.
- Kamal, Youssouf; Wieder, F.C. (1926–1953). Monumenta geographica Africae et Aegypti. Leiden: E.J. Brill. OCLC 556206903.
- Wieder, Frederik Casparus (1942). Tasman's kaart van zijn Australische ontdekkingen, 1644 / gereproduceerd op de ware grootte in goud en kleuren naar het orgineel, met tekst [Tasman's Map of his Australian Discoveries, 1644 / Reproduced at true size in gold and colours from the original, with text] (in Dutch). 's-Gravenhage: Nijhoff. OCLC 10346050052. Facsimile reproduction of Abel Janszoon Tasman's manuscript map, conserved at the Mitchell Library, Sydney, Australia.

== Secondary literature ==
- Berkvens-Stevelinck, Christiane (2012). Magna commoditas : Leiden University's great asset : 425 years library collections and services. Translated by UvA Talen, Amsterdam. Leiden: Leiden University Press. pp. 199–201, 207, 209, 223. ISBN 9789087281656. OCLC 794706996.
- Keuning, J. (1944). "In memoriam Dr. F.C. Wieder (1874-1943)". Het Boek. Serie 2. Jaargang 28 (in Dutch). Den Haag: Martinus Nijhoff. OCLC 69231304.
- Kramers, J.H. (1943). "Frederik Casparus Wieder, Mijnsheerenland, 23 November 1874 - Noordwijk, 7 Januari 1943". Jaarboek van de Maatschappij der Nederlandse Letterkunde (in Dutch). DBNL.
