= Vinda (Svalbard) =

River in Svalbard, Norway

Coordinates: 76.7698°N 15.9495°E

Vinda (the winding river) is a river in Sørkapp Land at Spitsbergen, Svalbard. It flows from Wiederfjellet along Bungebreen and reaches the sea at the northern side of Røysneset.
