= Lisbetdalen =

Valley of Spitsbergen, Norway

Coordinates: 76.8824°N 15.7329°E

Lisbetdalen is a mountain in Sørkapp Land at Spitsbergen, Svalbard. It has a length of about five kilometers, extending from the mountain pass Lidpasset down northwestwards to Hornsund. The valley is located between Struvefjella to the southwest, and Savičtoppen and Kovalevskajafjellet at the northeastern side. Lisbetdalen is named after Elisabet Thomson, the wife of Arctic explorer Adolf Hoel.
