= Gavrilovfjellet =

Mountain in Sørkapp Land at Spitsbergen, Svalbard

Coordinates: 76.8616°N 15.8435°E

Gavrilovfjellet is a mountain in Sørkapp Land at Spitsbergen, Svalbard. It has a height of 600 m.a.s.l., and is located between Slaklidalen and Liddalen.
