= Struvefjella =

Mountain range in Svalbard, Norway

Coordinates: 76.8729°N 15.6926°E

Struvefjella is a mountain range in Sørkapp Land at Spitsbergen, Svalbard. It is located southwest of the valley Lisbetdalen, and includes the three mountains of Hohenlohefjellet, Sergeevfjellet and Lidfjellet. The mountain area is named after astronomer Friedrich Georg Wilhelm von Struve.

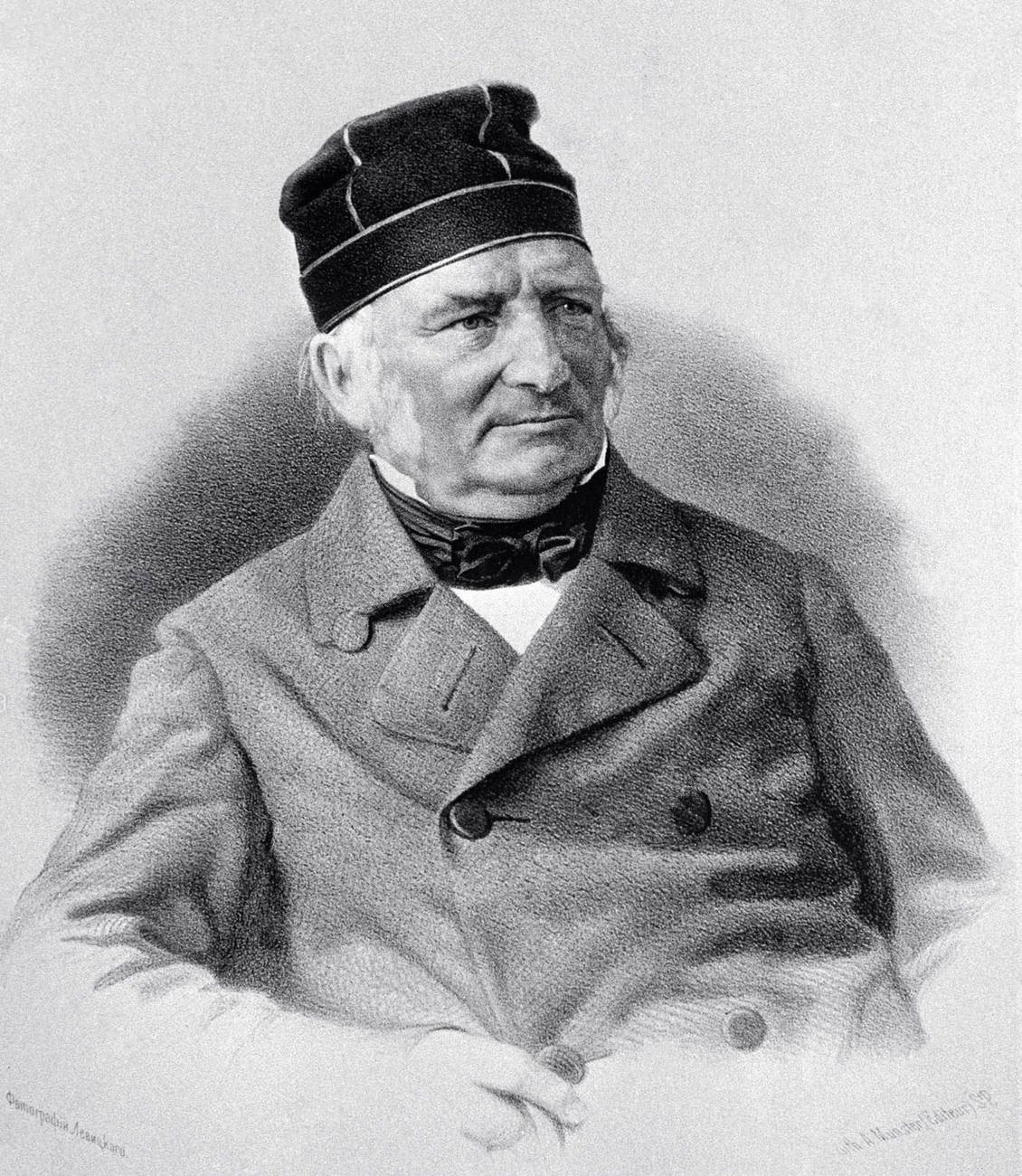
Struvefjella are named after German-Russian astronomer Friedrich Georg Wilhelm von Struve.

The highest and most northern summit is the saddle shaped Hohenlohefjellet, which marks the entrance of the fjord Hornsund.
