= Søre Randberget =

Mountain in Svalbard, Norway

Coordinates: 76.7386°N 17.0957°E

Søre Randberget is a mountain in Sørkapp Land at Spitsbergen, Svalbard. It has a height of 186 m.a.s.l., and is located north of Randbreen.
