= Hambergbreen =

Glacier in Svalbard, Norway

Coordinates: 77°03.2′N 17°01.2′E

Hambergbreen is a glacier on Spitsbergen, Svalbard, dividing Torell Land and Sørkapp Land, and debouching into the sea at the eastern coast of Spitsbergen. The glacier is named after Swedish geographer and explorer Axel Hamberg.
