= Sørkappfonna =

Glacier in Svalbard, Norway

Coordinates: 76.7086°N 16.7334°E

Sørkappfonna is a glaciated area in Sørkapp Land at Spitsbergen, Svalbard. It has a length of about fourteen kilometers, and a width of about five kilometers. The glacier debouches both into Stormbukta at the western coast, and into Isbukta at the eastern coast of Spitsbergen.

== See also ==
- List of glaciers in Svalbard
