= Bungevatnet =

Lake at Spitsbergen, Svalbard

- Location in Svalbard
- Location: Svalbard, Norway
- Coordinates: 76°45′20″N 16°02′50″E
- Primary inflows: Bungebreen
- Primary outflows: Sea

Bungevatnet is a lake in Sørkapp Land at Spitsbergen, Svalbard. It located south of the glacier Bungebreen, northeast of Tørrflya. The river Bungeelva flows from Bungevatnet to the sea. The lake is named after Russian Arctic explorer Alexandr Alexandrovich Bunge.
