= Torell Land =

Area in Svalbard

Coordinates: 77°16′30″N 16°43′00″E

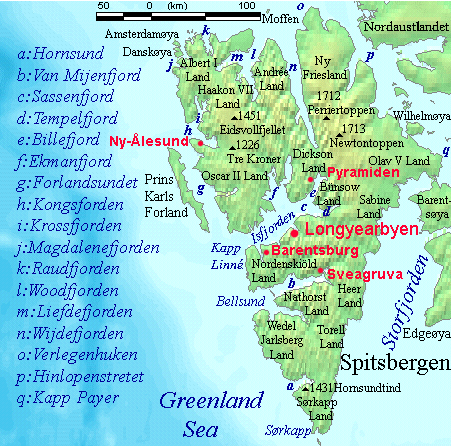
Torell Land is located at the southeast part of Spitsbergen.

Torell Land is a land area at the southeast part of Spitsbergen, Svalbard. It is named after Otto Martin Torell. Two glaciers, Hornbreen and Hambergbreen, divide Torell Land from Sørkapp Land.

Torell Land is included in the Sør-Spitsbergen National Park.
