= Vasil'evbreen =

Glacier in Svalbard, Norway

Coordinates: 76.7901°N 16.7395°E

Vasil'evbreen is a glacier in Sørkapp Land at Spitsbergen, Svalbard. It has an extension of about twenty kilometers, with several tributary glaciers. It is named after Russian astronomer Alexandr Semenovich Vasil'ev. The glacier has a wide front facing towards the eastern shore of Spitsbergen, including the bay of Isbukta. The southern part of Vasil'evbreen is called Randbreen, located north of Istoppane and Dumskolten, and south of Søre Randberget.
