= Liddalen =

Valley of Spitsbergen, Norway

Coordinates: 76.8613°N 15.7960°E

Liddalen is a valley in Sørkapp Land at Spitsbergen, Svalbard. It has a length of about 2.5 kilometers, and is located between Gavrilovfjellet and Lidfjellet. Liddalen is named after Norwegian botanist Johannes Lid.
