= Dumskolten =

Mountain in Spitsbergen, Svalbard

Highest point
- Elevation: 596 m.a.s.l.
- Coordinates: 76°N 17°E

Geography
- Location: Spitsbergen, Svalbard
- Country: Norway

Dumskolten is a mountain in Sørkapp Land at Spitsbergen, Svalbard. It has a height of 596 m.a.s.l., and is located south of the glacier Vasil'evbreen, north of the coastal plain Skoltsletta. The glacier Dumskoltbreen is located west of the mountain, between Dumskolten and Istoppane.
