= Olsokbreen =

Glacier in Svalbard, Norway

Coordinates: 76.7320°N 16.4766°E

Olsokbreen is a glacier in Sørkapp Land at Spitsbergen, Svalbard, in northern Norway. It has a length of about seventeen kilometers, and debouches into the bay Stormbukta at the western shore of Spitsbergen. The glacier front is about five kilometer long. Olsokbreen is a southern branch of the glacier Mefonna, which also has the northern branch Samarinbreen. Tributary glaciers to Olsokbreen are Kvithettbreen and Valettebreen, both coming from the east, from or between the mountains of Snøkrossen, Gråtinden, Kvithetta, Haitanna and Guilbaudtoppen.

Olsokbreen is one of the 163 tidewater glaciers in Svalbard. It lies in the southernmost tip of Svalbard.

Records show that between 1900 and 2008 the Olsokbreen has receded by 3.5 kilometers. It has gradually withdrawn from a peninsula to its north. Since 2010, however, it is the southern section of Olsokbreen that has seen more calving.

Images taken in 2010 also showed that the north–south calving front has become irregular. Further images taken from 2012 showed that the open water at the north side of the glacier between the terminus and the peninsula had extended. The natural prediction from these images is that the increase in the calving front's width will bring about an increase in calving.

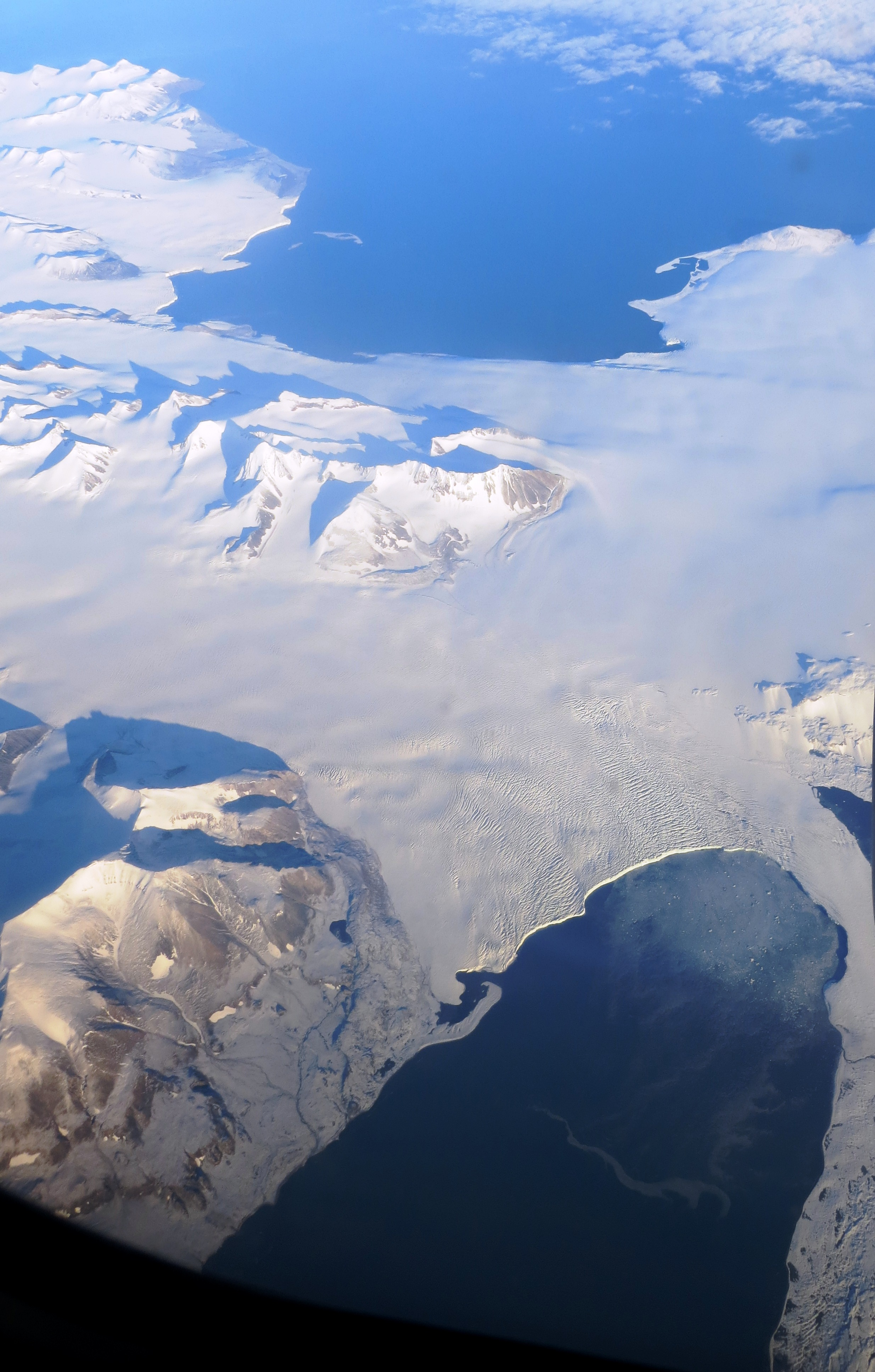
The southern region of Svalbard.

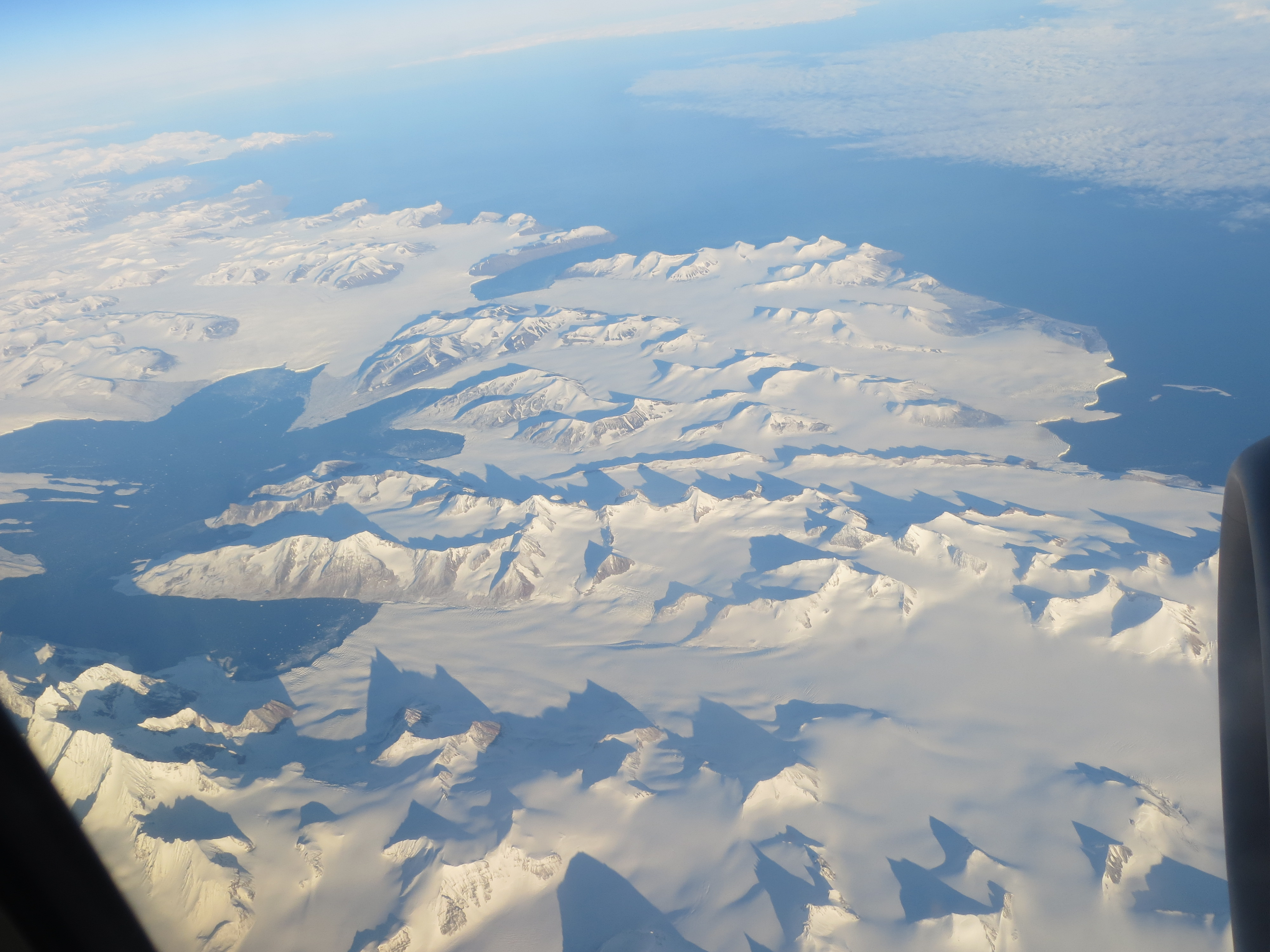
An aerial photo of the Svalbard region.
