= Ki-Gass =

Fuel priming system to assist starting engines

The Ki-Gass system, also referred to as Kigass or K-Gas, is "a system of starting petrol and Diesel engines by injecting finely divided fuel in the form of a mist into the in-take pipe." The system uses a hand-pump to spray fuel into the air in-take, thus priming the engine for easier starting. In the case of diesel engines, this spray was aimed at a heated Glowplug fitted into the manifold. Ki-Gass systems were widely used on aircraft, cars and tractors in 1944, including British Spitfire and Hurricane fighters.

The system is thought to have been introduced in the mid-1920s, when it was a feature of the 1926 Vauxhall 30-98 OE Tourer. It appears to have origins in fuel priming pumps developed in the early 20th century (e.g. by Frederick Lunkenheimer).

Manual priming was carried out via a small pump or push button (e.g., in some Ferguson TE20 Tractors).

Bugatti used Ki-Gass to aid starting on several of their early supercharged cars in the mid 1920s, such as the Bugatti Type 35. A lever on the dashboard allowed the driver to pump some gas into the intake.
