= Bungebreen =

Glacier in Svalbard, Norway

Coordinates: 76.8153°N 16.0941°E

Bungebreen is a glacier in Sørkapp Land at Spitsbergen, Svalbard. It has a length of about ten kilometers, and is located east of the mountain Wiederfjellet. The glacier is named after Russian Arctic explorer Alexandr Alexandrovich Bunge.

== See also ==
- Bungeelva
- Bungevatnet
