= Vitkovskijbreen =

Glacier in Svalbard, Norway

Coordinates: 76.7635°N 16.2562°E

Vitkovskijbreen is a glacier in Sørkapp Land at Spitsbergen, Svalbard. It has a length of about ten kilometers, and is located between the mountains of Hilmarfjellet and Plogen. The glacier is named after Russian scientist and General Vasilij Vasiljevich Vitkovskij.
