= Wiederfjellet =

Mountain in Svalbard, Norway

Coordinates: 76.8335°N 15.9446°E

Wiederfjellet is a mountain in Sørkapp Land at Spitsbergen, Svalbard. It has an extension of about 8.5 kilometers, and is partly covered by Wiederbreen. It is located west of Bungebreen, and contains Stupryggen, the limestone precipice Kalksteinstupa and the summit Gråkallen. The mountain is named after Dutch librarian Frederik Casparus Wieder of the Leiden University Library.
