= Sørkapp Land =

Peninsula in Svalbard, Norway

Coordinates: 76.8000°N 16.7500°E

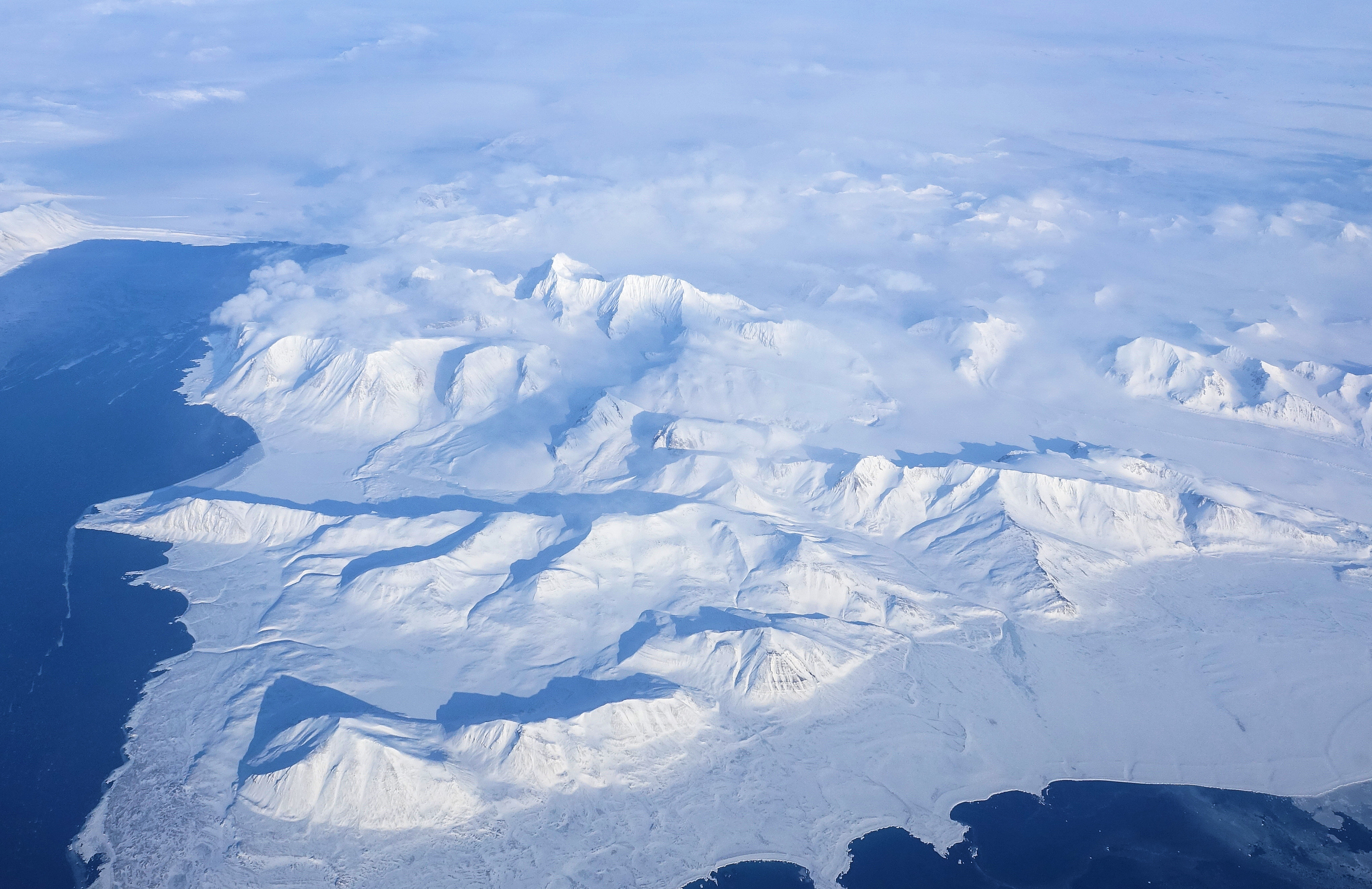
Northwestern Sørkapp Land

Sørkapp Land is the land area south of Hornsund, at the southern part of Spitsbergen, Svalbard. Two glaciers, Hornbreen and Hambergbreen, divide Sørkapp Land from Torell Land.

Sørkapp Land is included in the Sør-Spitsbergen National Park.
