= Stallofjellet =

Mountain in Svalbard, Norway

Coordinates: 78.365°N 13.377°E

Stallofjellet is a mountain in Oscar II Land at Spitsbergen, Svalbard. It reaches a height of 735 m.a.s.l. The mountain is located between the glaciers of Venernbreen, Stallobreen and Eidembreen, and has an extension of about three kilometers.

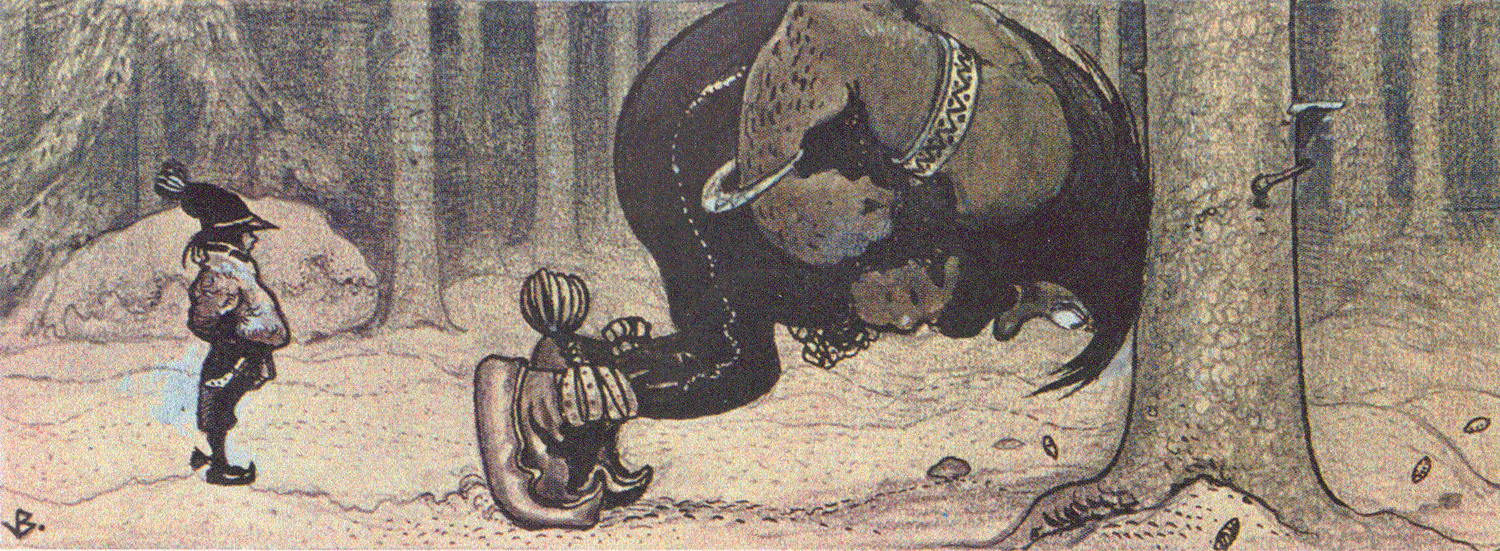
Stallofjellet is named after the stallo in Sami folklore.

Stallofjellet is named after the stallo creature in Sami folklore.
