= Thomas Edge =

English merchant and explorer (died 1624)

Thomas Edge (1587/88 – 29 December 1624) was an English merchant, whaler, and sealer who worked for the Muscovy Company in the first quarter of the 17th century. The son of Ellis Edge, Thomas Edge was born in the parish of Blackburn in Lancashire in 1587/88. Edgeøya (Edge Island in Svalbard, an island which English whalers rediscovered in 1616) takes its name from him. Edge's Point, the eastern point of Recherche Fjord (off Bellsund in Svalbard), also commemorated his name, but is now known as Lægerneset (the Camp Point).

== Working life, 1609–1622 ==
=== Sealing, 1609–1610 ===
In 1609 Edge served as supercargo of the Paul on a sealing voyage to Bear Island. In 1610 he again sailed to the island for sealing, this time as commander of the Lioness.

=== Whaling, 1611–1619 ===
In 1611, Edge was given command of two ships, the 150-ton ship Mary Margaret (which he sailed on as factor), and the 60-ton bark Elizabeth, Jonas Poole, master and pilot, on a whaling voyage to Spitsbergen. Edge, in his A Brief Discovery of the Northern Discoveries, which appeared in Purchas His Pilgrimes (1625), says the ships left Blackwall for Spitsbergen on 20 April (Poole says 11 April) and arrived there on 20 May.

On 12 June, he says one of the six Basque whalemen recruited from the French town of Saint-Jean-de-Luz caught the first Bowhead whale, "which yielded twelve Tuns of oil, being the first Oil that ever was made in Greenland." While hunting Walrus in or near English Bay (Engelskbukta) on 28 or 29 June, a "small quantity of Ice" came out of Foul Sound (Forlandsundet) and "put the Ship from her Mooring." Steven Bennet, master of the Mary Margaret, along with ten other men, were aboard the ship at the time. They lowered the sheet anchor to save the ship from being driven ashore, but "the Ice coming upon her again, brought her Anchor home and ran the Ship ashore." With the ship lost, Edge ordered the ship's boat and their four shallops made ready for sea. The boats were loaded with what provisions they could carry, and the men (totalling nearly fifty) left Forlandsundet on 15 July and sailed south.

One of the shallops and the ship's boat "lost company" with the other three boats while off Horn Sound. Here they met the Hopewell, of Hull, under Thomas Marmaduke, who, after hearing £1,500 worth of goods had been put ashore where the Mary Margaret had been lost, allowed the men to lead him to the place to retrieve said goods, as well as to hunt Walrus.

On 29 July, after having rowed and sailed for two weeks, the three boats landed on the south side of Bear Island. Edge sent three men to see if Poole and the Elizabeth where on the north side of the island. Here they found him. Poole sailed to the south side of the island, picked up the rest of the men, and sailed for Forlandsundet. Edge says they arrived at Forlandsundet on 14 August, where they found the other two boats' crews as well as Marmaduke. In attempting to transfer the goods of the Mary Margaret unto the Elizabeth, Poole allowed his ship to capsize, forcing them to freight themselves and what goods survived on the Hopewell. They arrived at Hull on 6 September, where Edge shipped their goods to London.

In 1612, Edge sailed to Spitsbergen as master of the Sea Horse. From 1613 to 1619 Edge served either as commander or co-commander of the English whaling fleet. He appears to have spent several of these seasons aboard ships that anchored in Bell Sound (Bellsund), the principal area for English whaling. He often had to deal with foreign interlopers intent on whaling in Spitsbergen. For example, in 1615 several Danish men-of-war, led by Gabriel Kruse, tried to force him to pay a fine to whale in what was claimed by the Danish to be part of Christian IV's territory, but he refused. In 1617 he ordered away a whaleship from Vlissingen but also allowed two Danish whaleships to hunt whales in Horn Sound, while in the following year he had to deal with several more vessels from the Dutch provinces. In 1620, to cover debts, the Muscovy Company handed over the whaling side to four members of the company, one being Edge. In 1621 and 1622 Edge and his partners again sent ships to Spitsbergen.

== Social life ==
On 31 January 1614, Edge married Bridget Poyntell, spinster and daughter of Richard Poyntell, of the parish of St. Botolph, Billingsgate, at the church of St. Martin-in-the-Fields. In November 1623 Edge, now of London, purchased the Manor of Bulsnape, in the parish of Kirkham, Lancashire. In August 1624 he purchased the manor of Little Hoole, Lancaster.

Edge died on 29 December 1624. He was survived by his wife Bridget, who had a child at the time, his two sons, Richard and George, and two daughters, Bridget and Ellen.
