= Nicholas Woodcock =

Nicholas Woodcock (c. 1585 – after June 1658?) was a 17th-century English mariner who sailed to Spitsbergen, Virginia, and Asia. He piloted the first Spanish whaling ship to Spitsbergen in 1612 and participated in the Anglo-Persian sieges of Kishm and Ormus in 1622.

== Life ==
=== Spitsbergen, 1610–1618 ===
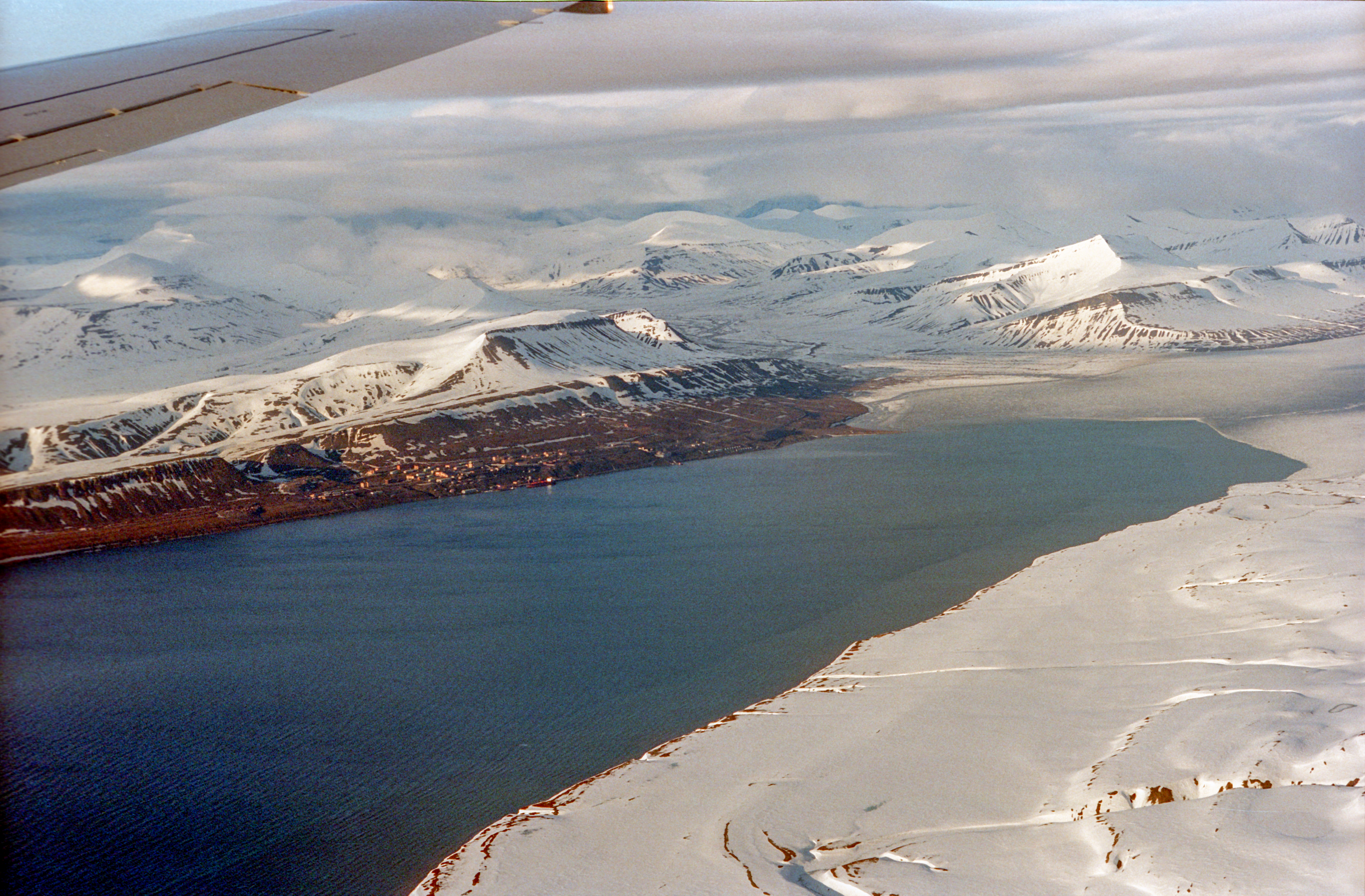
Grønfjorden, which Woodcock visited in 1612 and 1617

A man of the same name was sent on an expedition to the River Ob by the Muscovy Company in 1568. Seeing as how this name is not common, it is possible that Woodcock may have been a son or grandson of this namesake.

In 1610, he served as mate aboard the Muscovy Company ship Amity (60 tons) on a sealing and exploratory voyage to Spitsbergen. In 1611, Purchas (1625) states that it was he who suggested to the Muscovy Company that six Basque whalers from the town of St Jean de Luz, who had experience in the Terranova whale fishery, should be shipped the following season. Using his advice, the company sent these six whalers, as well as the Mary Margaret (150 tons), Steven Bennet, master, and the Elizabeth (60 tons), Jonas Poole, master, to Spitsbergen in 1611- the first voyage made to the island to hunt what was called the Greenland right whale (Balaena mysticetus). Angry over the fact he wasn't chosen to go on this expedition, he shipped aboard an interloping vessel from Hull, the Hopewell, Thomas Marmaduke, master. In 1612, Woodcock piloted the first whaleship from San Sebastian, under Juan de Erauso, to Spitsbergen. Although he was sent to the gatehouse and tower for sixteen months for leading the Spanish ship thither, it was the success of this voyage that induced a fleet of ships to sail from the Basque country and northern France the following season (1613).

In 1614 Woodcock returned to whaling. He was forced to serve under the Muscovy Company, which had been given a monopoly on the trade the previous year. He sailed as master of the Prosperous, which resorted to Sir Thomas Smith Bay (Forlandsundet) and Cross Road (Ebeltofthamna). In the latter area he established a temporary whaling station. In 1617 Woodcock is mentioned by the Danish as being a master of an English ship in Green Harbor (Grønfjorden). He is last mentioned in Spitsbergen in 1618, when he was master of the interloper Sea Horse.

=== East India Company, 1621–1623 ===
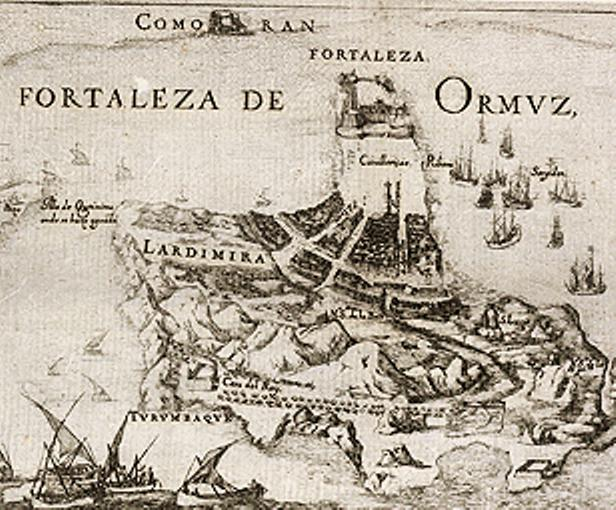
The city and fortress of Ormuz, 17th century

In 1622, Woodcock was among those present in the Anglo-Persian attack on Kishm (23 January – 1 February) and siege of Ormus (9 February – 23 April), in which he was master of the Whale, vice-admiral of the nine ship English fleet. He was accused of having "gotten an unknown booty at Ormus", which he vehemently denied, but was later found guilty of (November 1624). Woodcock is mentioned in the travels of Pietro Della Valle as master of the same vessel, in which Della Valle sailed from Bandar Abbas to Surat in January 1623. Della Valle said that Woodcock had spent over a year with his ship in the Persian Gulf, charting the Strait of Hormuz and adjacent areas for suitable anchorages. On 22 January (OS), while standing on the deck of the ship, Woodcock showed Della Valle what he believed to be a piece of unicorn horn (in fact a piece of the tusk of a narwhal), which he had found in Greenland (Spitsbergen) in 1611. Woodcock boastfully claimed to have been the first Christian to name and discover this country of Greenland the same year he had found the above-mentioned horn. Woodcock lost the Whale in March between Surat and Daman on his way to Mokha. Many of the crew drowned, among them his son, Richard. He also lost his whole estate. Woodcock was accused of having contributed to the loss of the Whale by taking out ballast and overloading the ship. Woodcock was in England from 1624 to 1626. In November 1626, at his request, he was acquitted and discharged by the Court. In May 1635 he was master of the Revenge of London, which loaded tobacco, skins and other goods in Virginia from Richard Bennett. At the time he was said to be a sailor of 50 years of age who resided at Wapping, Middlesex.

A will, dated 3 June 1658, is preserved in the Records of the Prerogative Court of Canterbury of a certain "Nicholas Woodcocke of King's Cliffe, Northamptonshire", which may or may not belong to the same Nicholas Woodcock.

== Legacy ==
Woodcock is one of the most important figures in the first phase of whaling in Spitsbergen (i.e. bay whaling), as he was not only the one to suggest shipping Basques for the first whaling voyage to Spitsbergen in 1611, but he led the first Basque vessel to Spitsbergen the following year. It was the success of the latter voyage that led to a boom on the trade in Spitsbergen. His suggestion led to the Basques being recruited not only by the English in later years, but by the Dutch, northern French, and Danish, all who relied on Basque experts in the opening years of the Spitsbergen fishery.
