= Huldrebreen =

Glacier in Svalbard, Norway

Coordinates: 78.43°N 13.18°E

Huldrebreen is a glacier in Oscar II Land at Spitsbergen, Svalbard. It is surrounded by the mountains of Huldrehatten, Huldrefjellet and Bytingen, west in the mountainous district of Trollheimen. Huldrebreen and Austgötabreen are located north of the glacier complex of Eidembreen. The glacier is named after Hulder in Scandinavian folklore.
