= Henry Hudson =

English explorer (c. 1565 – after 1611)

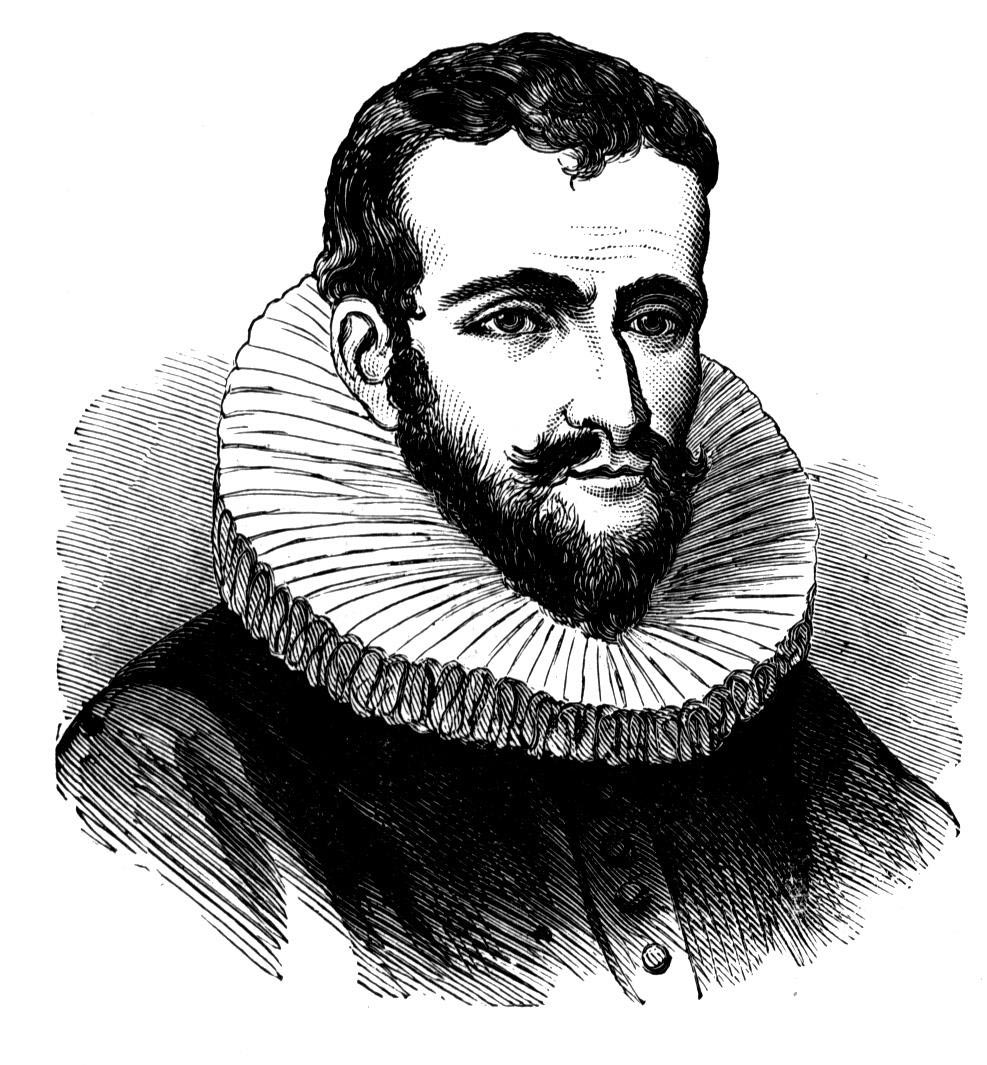
- One of many speculative portraits (Note: All known portraits used to represent Henry Hudson were drawn after his death.)
- Born: c. 1565; England
- Disappeared: 23 June 1611 (aged 45–46); James Bay
- Other name: Hendrick Hudson (in Dutch)
- Occupations: Sea explorer; navigator
- Years active: 1607–1611 (as explorer)
- Employers: Muscovy Company of London; Dutch East India Company; British East India Company; Virginia Company of Plymouth
- Known for: Exploration of northeastern North America; Search for the Northeast and Northwest Passages
- Children: John Hudson (c. 1591–1611)

Henry Hudson (c. 1565 – disappeared 23 June 1611) was an English sea explorer and navigator during the early 17th century, best known for his explorations of present-day Canada and parts of the Northeastern United States.

In 1607 and 1608, Hudson made two attempts on behalf of English merchants to find a rumoured Northeast Passage to Cathay via a route above the Arctic Circle. In 1609, he landed in North America on behalf of the Dutch East India Company and explored the region around the modern New York metropolitan area. Looking for a Northwest Passage to Asia on his ship Halve Maen ("Half Moon"), he sailed up the Mahicannittuk (Mohican), (a.k.a., Ka'nón:no [Mohawk] and Muhheakantuck [Lenape]), later named the Hudson River, and thereby laid the foundation for Dutch colonization of the region. His contributions to the exploration of the New World were significant and lasting. His voyages helped to establish European contact with the native peoples of North America and contributed to the development of trade and commerce.

On his final expedition, while still searching for the Northwest Passage, Hudson became the first European to see Hudson Strait and the immense Hudson Bay. In 1611, after wintering on the shore of James Bay, Hudson wanted to press on to the west, but most of his crew mutinied. The mutineers cast Hudson, his son, and six others adrift; what then happened to the Hudsons and their companions is unknown.

== Early life ==
Virtually nothing of Hudson's early life is known for certain. His year of birth is variously estimated between 1560 and 1570. He may have been born in London and it is possible that his father was an alderman of that city. When Hudson first entered the historical record in 1607, he was already an experienced mariner with sufficient credentials to be commissioned the leader of an expedition charged with a search for a trade route across the North Pole.

== Exploration ==
=== Expeditions of 1607 and 1608 ===
In 1607, the Muscovy Company of England hired Hudson to find a northerly route to the Pacific coast of Asia. At the time, the English were engaged in an economic battle with the Dutch for control of northwest routes. It was thought that, because the sun shone for three months in the northern latitudes in the summer, the ice would melt, and a ship could make it across the "top of the world".

On 1 May 1607, Hudson sailed with a crew of ten men and a boy on the 80-ton Hopewell. They reached the east coast of Greenland on 13 May, coasting northward until 22 May. Here the party named a headland "Young's Cape", a "very high mount, like a round castle" near it "Mount of God's Mercy" and land at 73° north latitude "Hold with Hope". After turning east, they sighted "Newland" (Spitsbergen) on 27 May near the mouth of the great bay Hudson later simply named the "Great Indraught" (Isfjorden).

On 13 July, Hudson and his crew estimated that they had sailed as far north as 80° 23′ N, (Note: Observations made during this voyage were often wrong, sometimes greatly so. See Conway 1906.) but had more likely only reached 79° 23′ N. The following day they entered what Hudson later in the voyage named "Whales Bay" (Krossfjorden and Kongsfjorden), naming its northwestern point "Collins Cape" (Kapp Mitra) after his boatswain, William Collins. They sailed north the following two days. On 16 July, they reached as far north as Hakluyt's Headland (which Thomas Edge says Hudson named on this voyage) at 79° 49′ N, thinking they saw the land continue to 82° N (Svalbard's northernmost point is 80° 49′ N) when really it trended to the east. Encountering ice packed along the north coast, they were forced to turn back south. Hudson wanted to make his return "by the north of Greenland to Davis his Streights (Davis Strait), and so for Kingdom of England", but ice conditions would have made this impossible. The expedition returned to Tilbury Hope on the River Thames on 15 September.

Hudson reported large numbers of whales in Spitsbergen waters during this voyage. Many authors (Note: Sandler 2008, p. 407; Umbreit 2005, p. 1; Shorto 2004, p. 21; Mulvaney 2001, p. 38; Davis et al. 1997, p. 31; Francis 1990, p. 30; Rudmose-Brown 1920, p. 312; Chisholm 1911, p. 942.) credit his reports as the catalyst for several nations sending whaling expeditions to the islands. This claim is contentious; others have pointed to strong evidence that it was Jonas Poole's reports in 1610, that led to the establishment of English whaling, and voyages of Nicholas Woodcock and Willem Cornelisz van Muyden in 1612, which led to the establishment of Dutch, French and Spanish whaling. The whaling industry was built by neither Hudson nor Poole—both were dead by 1612.

In 1608, English merchants of the East India and Muscovy Companies again sent Hudson in Hopewell to attempt to locate a passage to the Indies, this time to the east around northern Russia. Leaving London on 22 April, the ship travelled almost 2,500 mi (4,000 km), making it to Novaya Zemlya well above the Arctic Circle in July, but even in the summer they found the ice impenetrable and turned back, arriving at Gravesend on 26 August.

==== Alleged discovery of Jan Mayen ====
According to Thomas Edge, "William [sic] Hudson" in 1608 discovered an island he named "Hudson's Tutches" (Touches) at 71° N, the latitude of Jan Mayen. However, records of Hudson's voyages suggest that he could only have come across Jan Mayen in 1607 by making an illogical detour, and historians have pointed out that Hudson himself made no mention of it in his journal. (Note: "The above relation by Thomas Edge is obviously incorrect. Hudson's Christian name is wrongly given, and the year in which he visited the north coast of Spitsbergen was 1607, not 1608. Moreover, Hudson himself has given an account of the voyage and makes absolutely no mention of Hudson's Tutches. It would have been hardly possible indeed for him to visit Jan Mayen on his way home from Bear Island to the Thames." Wordie 1922, p. 182.) There is also no cartographical proof of this supposed discovery.

Jonas Poole in 1611 and Robert Fotherby in 1615 both had possession of Hudson's journal while searching for his elusive Hold-with-Hope—which is now believed to have been on the east coast of Greenland—but neither had any knowledge of any discovery of Jan Mayen, an achievement which was only later attributed to Hudson. Fotherby eventually stumbled across Jan Mayen, thinking it a new discovery and naming it "Sir Thomas Smith's Island", though the first verifiable records of the discovery of the island had been made a year earlier, in 1614.

=== Expedition of 1609 ===
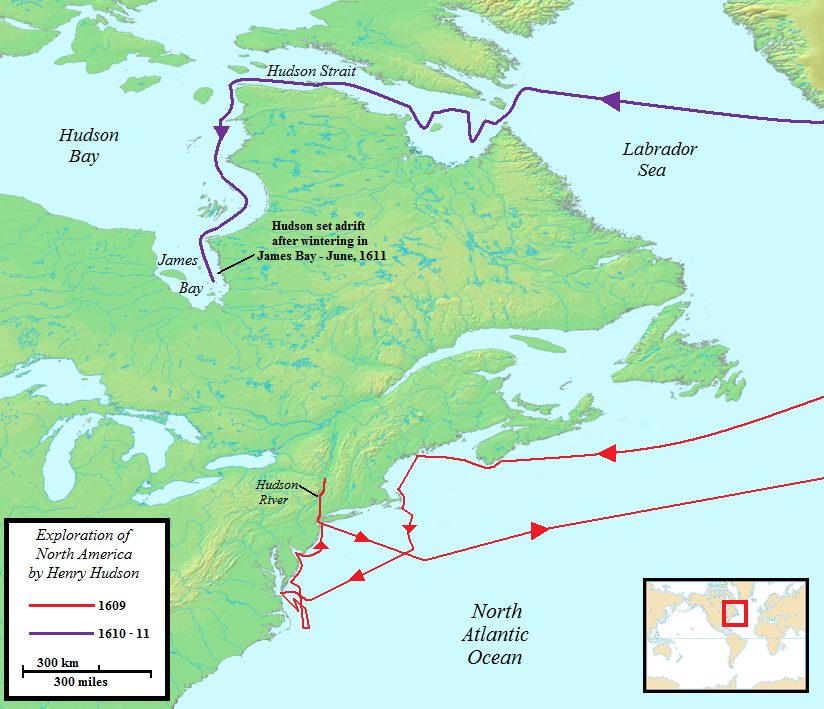
Hudson's voyages to North America

In 1609, Hudson was chosen by merchants of the Dutch East India Company in the Netherlands to find an easterly passage to Asia. While awaiting orders and supplies in Amsterdam, he heard rumours of a northwest route to the Pacific through North America. Hudson had been told to sail through the Arctic Ocean north of Russia, into the Pacific and so to the Far East. Hudson departed Amsterdam on 4 April, in command of the Dutch ship Halve Maen (English: Half Moon). He could not complete the specified (eastward) route because ice blocked the passage, as with all previous such voyages, and he turned the ship around in mid-May while somewhere east of Norway's North Cape. At that point, acting outside his instructions, Hudson pointed the ship west and decided to try to seek a westerly passage through North America.

They reached the Grand Banks of Newfoundland on 2 July, and in mid-July made landfall near the LaHave area of Nova Scotia. Here they encountered Indigenous people who were accustomed to trading with the French; they were willing to trade beaver pelts, but apparently no trades occurred. The ship stayed in the area about ten days, the crew replacing a broken mast and fishing for food. On the 25 July, a dozen men from Halve Maen, using muskets and small cannon, went ashore and assaulted the village near their anchorage. They drove the people from the settlement and took their boat and other property—probably pelts and trade goods.

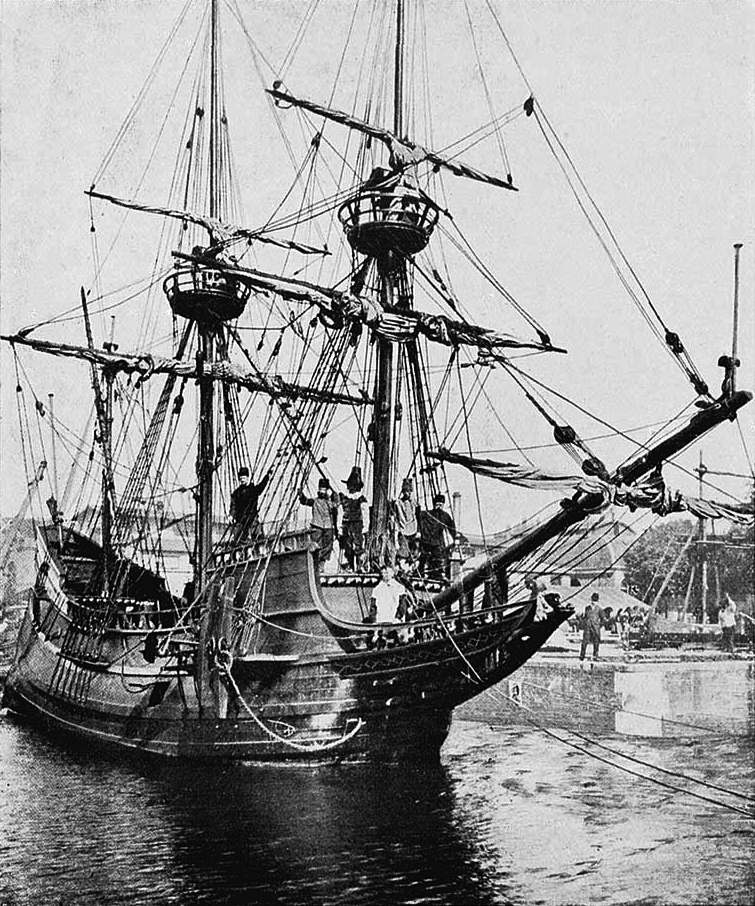
Replica of the Halve Maen

On 4 August, the ship was at Cape Cod, from which Hudson sailed south to the entrance of the Chesapeake Bay. Rather than entering the Chesapeake he explored the coast to the north, finding Delaware Bay but continuing on north. On 3 September, he reached the estuary of the river that initially was called the "North River" or "Mauritius" and now carries his name. He was not the first European to discover the estuary, though, as it had been known since the voyage of Giovanni da Verrazzano in 1524.

On 6 September 1609, John Colman of his crew was killed by natives with an arrow to his neck. Hudson sailed into the Upper New York Bay on 11 September, and the following day encountered a large group of 28 Lenape canoes occupied by Lenape Natives, from whom he bought oysters and beans. He then began a journey up what is now known as the Hudson River. Over the next ten days his ship ascended the river, reaching a point near Stuyvesant Landing (Old Kinderhook). There the ship's boat with five crew members ventured to the vicinity of present-day Albany.

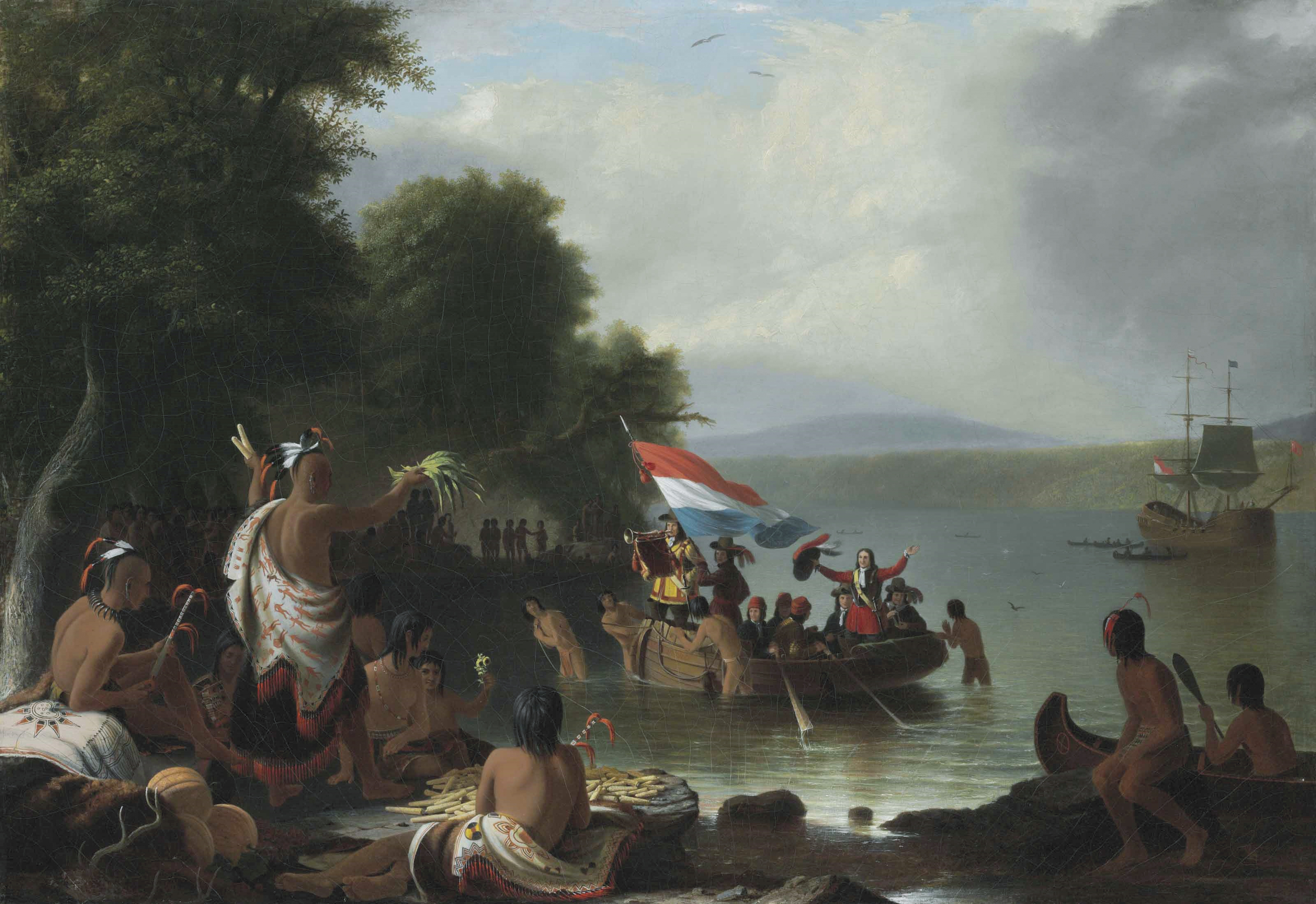
Landing of Henry Hudson, 1609, at Verplanck Point, New York, by Robert Walter Weir

On 23 September, Hudson decided to return to Europe. On his way back to Holland, he put in at Dartmouth, England on 7 November, and was detained by authorities who wanted access to his log. He passed the log to the Dutch ambassador to England, who sent it, along with his report, to Amsterdam.

While exploring the Hudson River, Hudson had traded with several native groups, mainly obtaining furs. His voyage established Dutch claims to the region and to the fur trade that prospered there when a trading post was established at Albany in 1614. New Amsterdam on Manhattan Island became the capital of New Netherland in 1625.

=== Expedition of 1610–1611 ===
In 1610, Hudson obtained backing for another voyage, this time under the English flag. The funding came from the Virginia Company and the British East India Company. At the helm of his new ship Discovery, he travelled to the north (some claim he had deliberately stayed too far south on his Dutch-funded voyage). He reached Iceland on 11 May, the south of Greenland on 4 June, and then rounded the southern tip of Greenland.

On 25 June, the explorers reached what is now the Hudson Strait at the northern tip of Labrador. Following the southern coast of the strait on 2 August, the ship entered Hudson Bay. They were excited, expecting that their ship had finally found the Northwest Passage through the continent. Hudson spent the following months mapping and exploring its eastern shores, but he and his crew did not find a passage to Asia. In November, ice trapped the ship in James Bay , and the crew moved ashore for the winter.

==== Mutiny ====
When the ice cleared in the spring of 1611, Hudson announced he planned to use the ship Discovery to further explore Hudson Bay still with the professed goal of discovering a Passage. (An alternative motive for his attempted continued exploration of James Bay is the search for mineral wealth, according to one historian.)

However, most of his crew said they ardently desired to return home instead. They mutinied in June.

Descriptions of the mutiny are one-sided, because the only survivors were the mutineers and those who went along with the mutiny. Among the mutineers was ship's navigator, Abacuk Pricket. He survived to tell his tale and also kept a journal that became one of the sources for the narrative of the mutiny. According to Pricket, the leaders of the mutiny were Henry Greene and Robert Juet. The latter, a navigator, had accompanied Hudson on the 1609 expedition, and his account is said to be "the best contemporary record of the voyage". Pricket's narrative tells how the mutineers set Hudson, his teenage son John, and seven crewmen—men who were either sick and infirm or loyal to Hudson—adrift from Discovery in a small shallop, an open boat, effectively marooning them in Hudson Bay. The Pricket journal reports that the mutineers provided the castaways with clothing, powder and shot, some pikes, an iron pot, some food, and other miscellaneous items.

==== Disappearance ====
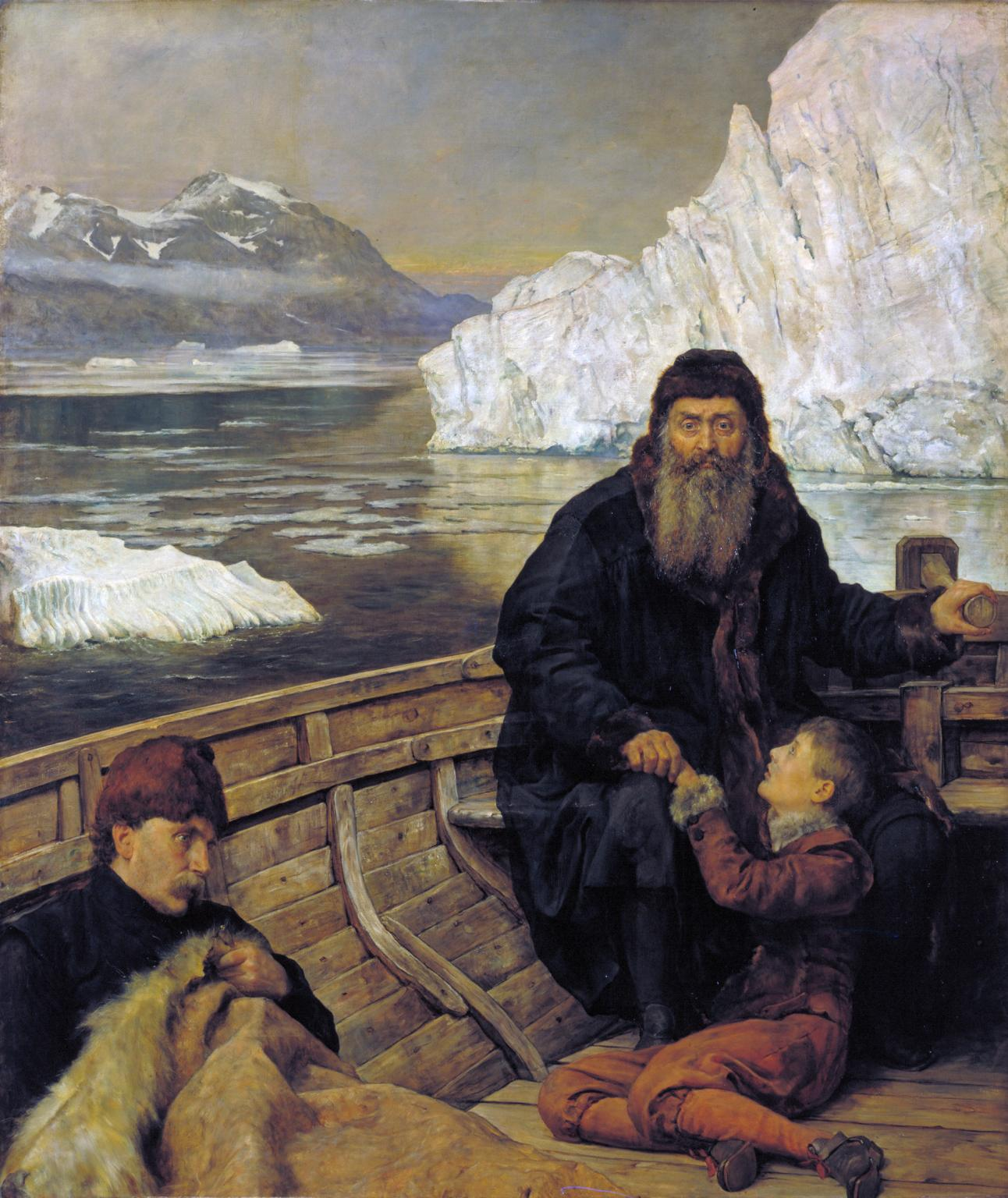
The Last Voyage of Henry Hudson, John Collier's 1881 painting of Hudson, his son, and loyal crew set adrift

After the mutiny, the men in the shallop broke out oars and for some time tried to keep up with the Discovery. Pricket recalled that the mutineers finally tired of the pursuit and unfurled additional sails aboard Discovery, enabling the larger vessel to leave the tiny open boat behind. Hudson and the other seven aboard the shallop were never seen by Europeans again. Despite subsequent searches, including those conducted by Thomas Button in 1612 and by Zachariah Gillam in 1668–1670, their fate is unknown.

==== Pricket's reliability ====
While Pricket's account is one of the few surviving records of the voyage, some historians have questioned its reliability. Pricket's journal and testimony have been severely criticized as being biased, on two grounds. Firstly, prior to the mutiny the alleged leaders of the uprising, Greene and Juet, were friends and loyal seamen of Hudson. Secondly, Greene and Juet did not survive the return voyage to England (Juet, who had been the navigator on the return journey, was said to have died of starvation a few days before the company reached Ireland). Pricket knew he and the other survivors of the mutiny would be tried in England for piracy, and it would have been in his interest, and the interest of the other survivors, to put together a narrative that placed the blame for the mutiny upon men who were no longer alive to defend themselves.

The Pricket narrative became the controlling story of the expedition's disastrous end. Only eight of the thirteen mutinous crewmen survived the return voyage to Europe. They were arrested in England, and some were put on trial, but no punishment was imposed for the mutiny. One theory holds that the survivors were considered too valuable as sources of information to execute, as they had travelled to the New World and could describe sailing routes and conditions.

==== Later developments ====
In 1612, Nicolas de Vignau claimed he saw wreckage of an English ship on the shores of James Bay, located on the southern end of Hudson Bay—while this was discounted at the time by Samuel de Champlain, historians believe it may have credence.

British-born Canadian author Dorothy Harley Eber (1925–2022) collected Inuit testimonies that she thought referred to Hudson and his son after the mutiny. According to these, an old man with a long white beard and a young boy arrived in a small wooden boat. The Inuit had never seen a white person before, but they took them to an encampment and fed them. After the old man died, the Inuit tethered the boy to one of their houses so he would not run away. Despite the long time that had passed, their stories might be due credence: long-ignored Inuit testimonies led to the discovery of the wrecks of the two ships of Franklin's lost expedition of 1845, HMS Erebus and HMS Terror, in the 2010s. Charles Francis Hall, who searched for Franklin in the mid-19th century, also collected Inuit stories that he interpreted as referring to the even earlier expedition of Martin Frobisher, who explored the area and mined fool's gold in 1578.

In the late 1950s, a 150-pound (68 kg) stone near Deep River, Ontario, which is approximately 600 kilometres (370 mi) south of James Bay, was found to have carving on it with Hudson's initials (H. H.), the year 1612, and the word "captive". While lettering on the stone was consistent with English maps of the 17th century, the date of the carving has not been verified.

== Legacy ==
The bay visited by and named after Hudson is three times the size of the Baltic Sea, and its many large estuaries afford access to otherwise landlocked parts of Western Canada and the Arctic. This allowed the Hudson's Bay Company to exploit a lucrative fur trade along its shores for more than two centuries, growing powerful enough to influence the history and present international boundaries of western North America.

Along with Hudson Bay and Hudson Strait in Canada, many other topographical features and landmarks are named for Hudson. The Hudson River in New York and New Jersey is named after him, as are Hudson County, New Jersey, the Henry Hudson Bridge, the Henry Hudson Parkway, and the city of Hudson, New York.

== See also ==
- Age of Discovery
- List of people who disappeared mysteriously (pre-1910)
- List of people who disappeared mysteriously at sea
