= Runebomma =

Mountain in Norway

Coordinates: 78.384°N 13.476°E

Runebomma is a mountain in Oscar II Land at Spitsbergen, Svalbard, a Norwegian archipelago in the Arctic Ocean. It has a height of 729 m.a.s.l., and is located between the glaciers of Venernbreen, Heksebreen and Eidembreen. Runebomma is part of the mountainous district of Trollheimen.
