= Sparrefjellet =

Mountain in Svalbard, Norway

Coordinates: 78.364°N 13.135°E

Sparrefjellet is a mountain in Oscar II Land at Spitsbergen, Svalbard. It reaches a height of 788 m.a.s.l. and extends over a length of about five kilometers. The mountain is located between the glaciers of Venernbreen, Eidembreen and Stallobreen. It is named after Norwegian naval officer Christian Sparre.
