= Tussekallen =

Mountain in Svalbard, Norway

Coordinates: 78.40°N 13.52°E

Tussekallen ("The Gnome") is a mountain in Oscar II Land at Spitsbergen, Svalbard. It has a height of 729 m.a.s.l., and is located between the glaciers of Venernbreen and Eidembreen. Tussekallen is part of the mountainous district of Trollheimen.
