= Movas =

Movas may refer to:

- Mavas, a village in Azerbaijan
- Santa Ana de Movas, a historic mission in Sonora, Mexico

== See also ==
- Mova
