= Motalafjella =

Mountain range in Svalbard, Norway

Coordinates: 78.445°N 12.934°E

Motalafjella is a mountain range in Oscar II Land at Spitsbergen, Svalbard. It is located north of Eidembreen, between the glaciers of Austgötabreen and Vestgötabreen. Its highest peak reaches a height of 886 m.a.s.l. The mountain range is named after the Swedish city of Motala.
