= Gunnar Knudsenfjella =

Mountain group in Svalbard, Norway

Coordinates: 78.486°N 13.170°E

Gunnar Knudsenfjella is a mountain group in Oscar II Land at Spitsbergen, Svalbard. The mountains are located south of St. Jonsfjorden, and are surrounded by the glaciers of Charlesbreen, Løvliebreen and Eidembreen.

The mountain group is named after ship owner and Prime Minister of Norway, Gunnar Knudsen.

Parts of Gunnar Knudsenfjella belong to the Trollheimen mountainous district.
