= Tomtegubben =

Mountain in Svalbard, Norway

Highest point
- Elevation: 779 m (2,556 ft)
- Coordinates: 78°27′51″N 13°36′15″E

Geography
- Location: Svalbard
- Country: Norway
- Region: Spitsbergen
- District: Oscar II Land

Tomtegubben ("The Brownie") is a mountain in Oscar II Land at Spitsbergen, Svalbard. It has a height of 779 m.a.s.l., and is located between the glaciers of Borebreen and Eidembreen. Tomtegubben is part of the mountainous district of Trollheimen.
