= Comfortlessbreen =

Glacier in Svalbard, Norway

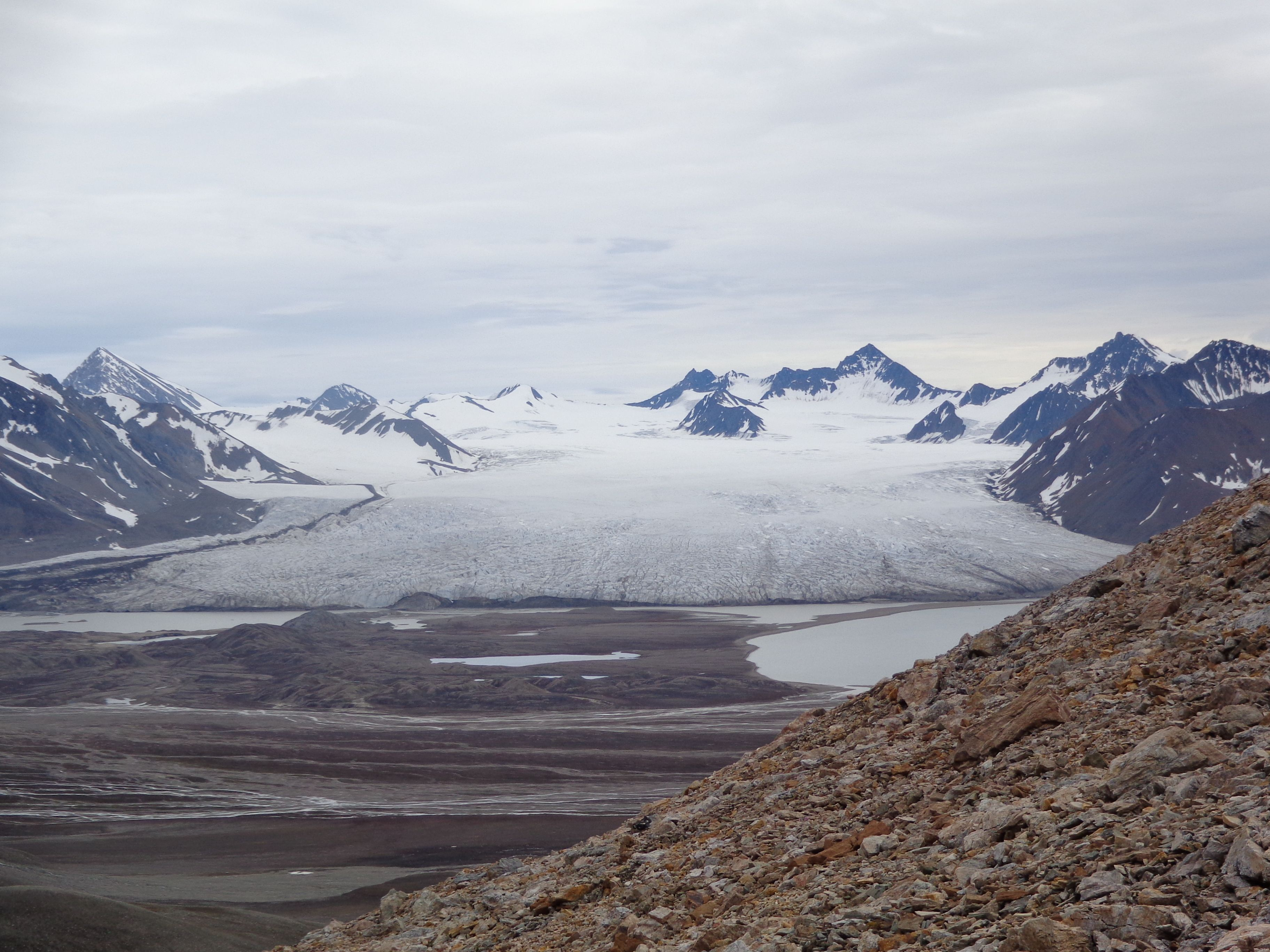

- Location within Svalbard
- Type: Glacier
- Location: Oscar II Land; Spitsbergen, Svalbard
- Coordinates: 78.76°N 12.14°E
- Length: 14 km (8.7 mi)
- Width: 3 km (1.9 mi)
- Terminus: Engelskbukta

Comfortlessbreen is a glacier in Oscar II Land at Spitsbergen, Svalbard. It has a length of about fourteen kilometers, and a maximum width of three kilometers. The glacier debouches into Engelskbukta, after a merge with Uvêrsbreen. Comfortlessbreen is separated from Uvêrsbreen by the mountain range of Trondheimfjella (with Domkyrkja in the west).
