= Heksefjellet =

Mountain in Svalbard, Norway

Coordinates: 78.385°N 13.338°E

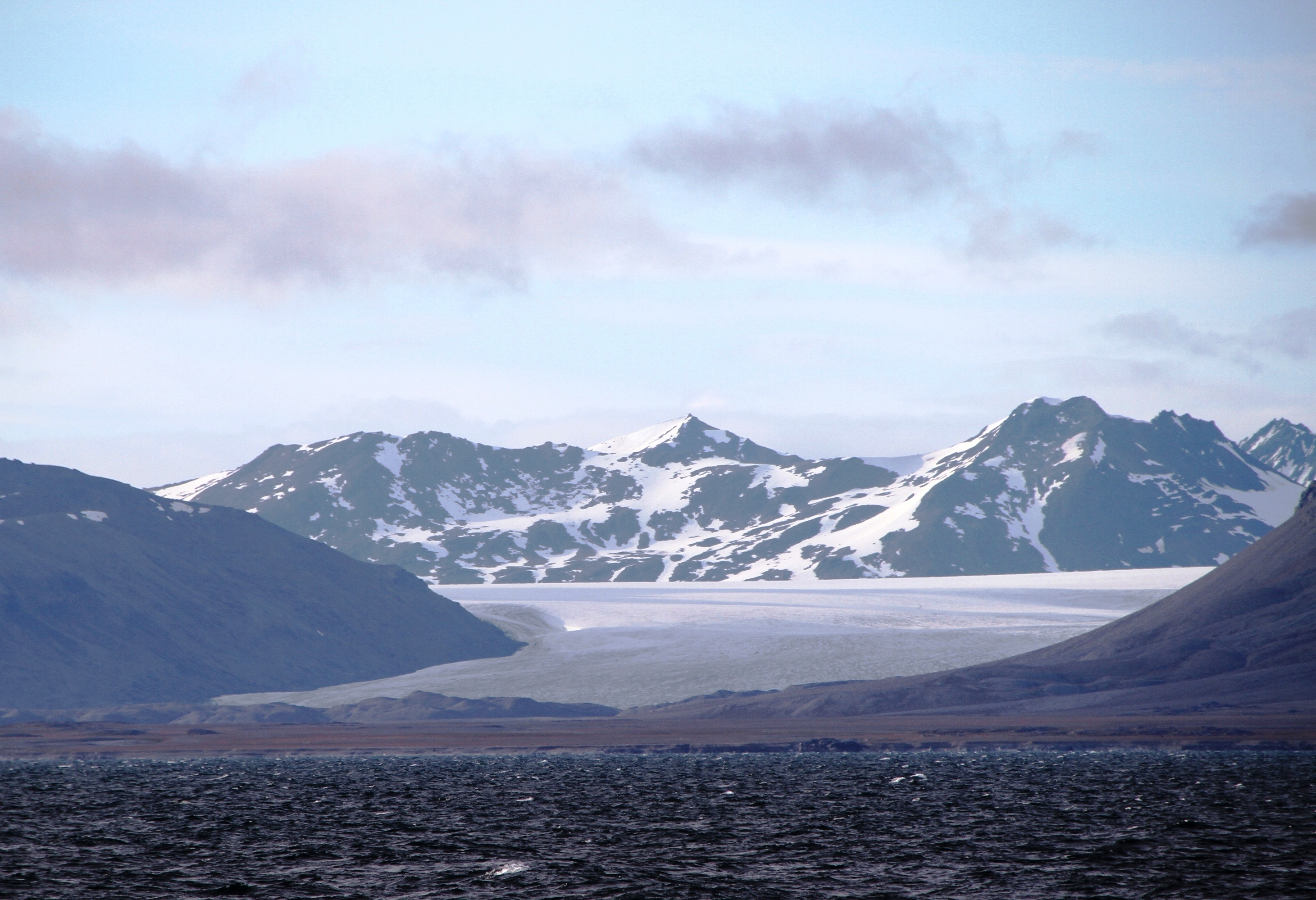
Mountainous southeastern part of Oscar II Land with Heksefjellet, Stallofjellet and Vetternbreen, western Spitsbergen, seen from the Isfjorden bay in southeast - Svalbard - Norway.

Heksefjellet ("The Witch Mountain") is a mountain in Oscar II Land at Spitsbergen, Svalbard. It reaches a height of 774 m.a.s.l. and is located between the glaciers of Heksebreen and Stallobreen, south of Eidembreen. The mountain is part of the mountainous district of Trollheimen.
