= Daudmannsodden =

Headland in Spitsbergen, Svalbard

Coordinates: 78.22°N 13.00°E

Daudmannsodden ("Dead Man's Cape") is a headland in Oscar II Land at Spitsbergen, Svalbard. It has a length of about three kilometers. Daudmannsodden and Salpynten mark the southern entrance of the strait of Forlandsundet. The coast between Daudmannsodden and Eidembukta is characterized by foul waters, skerries and islets outside small bays.
