= Huldrefjellet =

Mountain in Svalbard, Norway

Coordinates: 78°25′29″N 13°07′47″E

Huldrefjellet ("the fairy-lady mountain") is a mountain in Oscar II Land at Spitsbergen, Svalbard. The mountain has a height of 725 m.a.s.l. and is located north of Eidembreen, between Huldrebreen and Austgötabreen. Huldrefjellet is part of the Trollheimen range.
