= Gabriel Kruse =

Gabriel Christoffersen Kruse (died 1647) of Tulsted and Hjulebjerg was an officer in the Royal Dano-Norwegian Navy. He became a captain in 1610 and fought in the Kalmar War (1611–13) and the War against the Emperor (1625–29).

== Family ==
Kruse was the son of Christoffer Thomesen Kruse (d. 1631) and Anne Jørgensdatter Kruse (d. 1622). He had two brothers, Enevold Christoffersen Kruse (d. 1626) and Jørgan Christophersen Kruse (d. 1666). He married twice, first to Agneta Eriksdatter Thot (d. 1642) in 1613 and later (1642) to Karen Hansdatter Lykke (d. 1665). He had two children with his first wife: Enevold Gabrielsen Kruse and Erik Gabrielsen Kruse, the latter born in 1623.

== Career ==
After his service in the Kalmar War, where he participated in the assaults on Kalmar and Älvsborg, he led a naval expedition to Spitsbergen in 1615 in order to reassert Christian IV's claim to the region. With three men-of-war and two pinnaces, and Scotsman John Cunningham among his commanders, he reached the coast of Spitsbergen in July, where he met the English explorer Robert Fotherby. A few days later he met the admiral of the English whaling fleet, Thomas Edge, who refused to recognize Christian IV's sovereignty or pay a duty to hunt there. He then met the Dutch admiral Adriaen Block, who also refused to pay any fine.

In May 1627 he was Admiral of the Elbe fleet, and later the same year served as Admiral of the Fleet off Lübeck, where he was authorized to free any ships from the port that had been seized. Late the following year he was named Admiral of the Baltic fleet. In 1629 Kruse commanded several ships of the Baltic fleet, which was now under the noblemen Henrik Vind. In May 1630 he was again Admiral of the Elbe fleet.
