= Kinnefjellet =

Mountain in Svalbard, Norway

Coordinates: 78.322°N 13.176°E

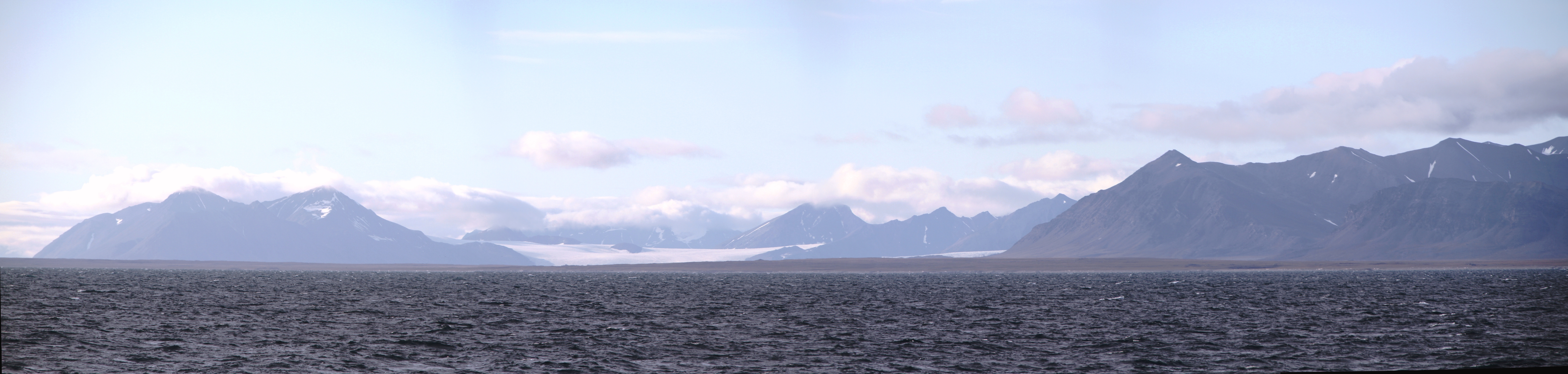
Daudmannsodden is a cape at the low Coastal plain (Daudmannsøyra) in the southwestern part of Oscar II Land, Spitsbergen (Svalbard) - Norway.The glacier Venernbreen is here surrounded by Sparrefjellet (left) and Kinnefjellet (right).

Kinnefjellet is a mountain in Oscar II Land at Spitsbergen, Svalbard. It has peaks with heights of 601 and 544 m.a.s.l. and is located at the southern side of Venernbreen. The mountain is named after the hill of Kinnekulle in the Swedish province of Västergötland.
