= Eidembukta =

Bay in Svalbard, Norway

Coordinates: 78.36°N 12.82°E

Eidembukta is a bay in Oscar II Land at Spitsbergen, Svalbard. It has a width of about 4.5 kilometers, and is located at the southeastern side of Forlandsundet. The glacier of Eidembreen debouches into the bay. The bay is named after Norwegian politician and naval officer Ole Thorenius Eidem.
