= Hofgaardtoppen =

Mountain in Svalbard, Norway

Coordinates: 78.7332°N 12.5641°E

Hofgaardtoppen is a mountain in Oscar II Land at Spitsbergen, Svalbard. The mountain has a height of 1,125 m.a.s.l. and is located southwest of Uvêrsbreen. It is named after Norwegian military officer Hans Jacob Hofgaard. Hofgaardtoppen is the highest mountain in Oscar II Land.
