= Huldrehatten =

Coordinates: 78.443°N 13.139°E

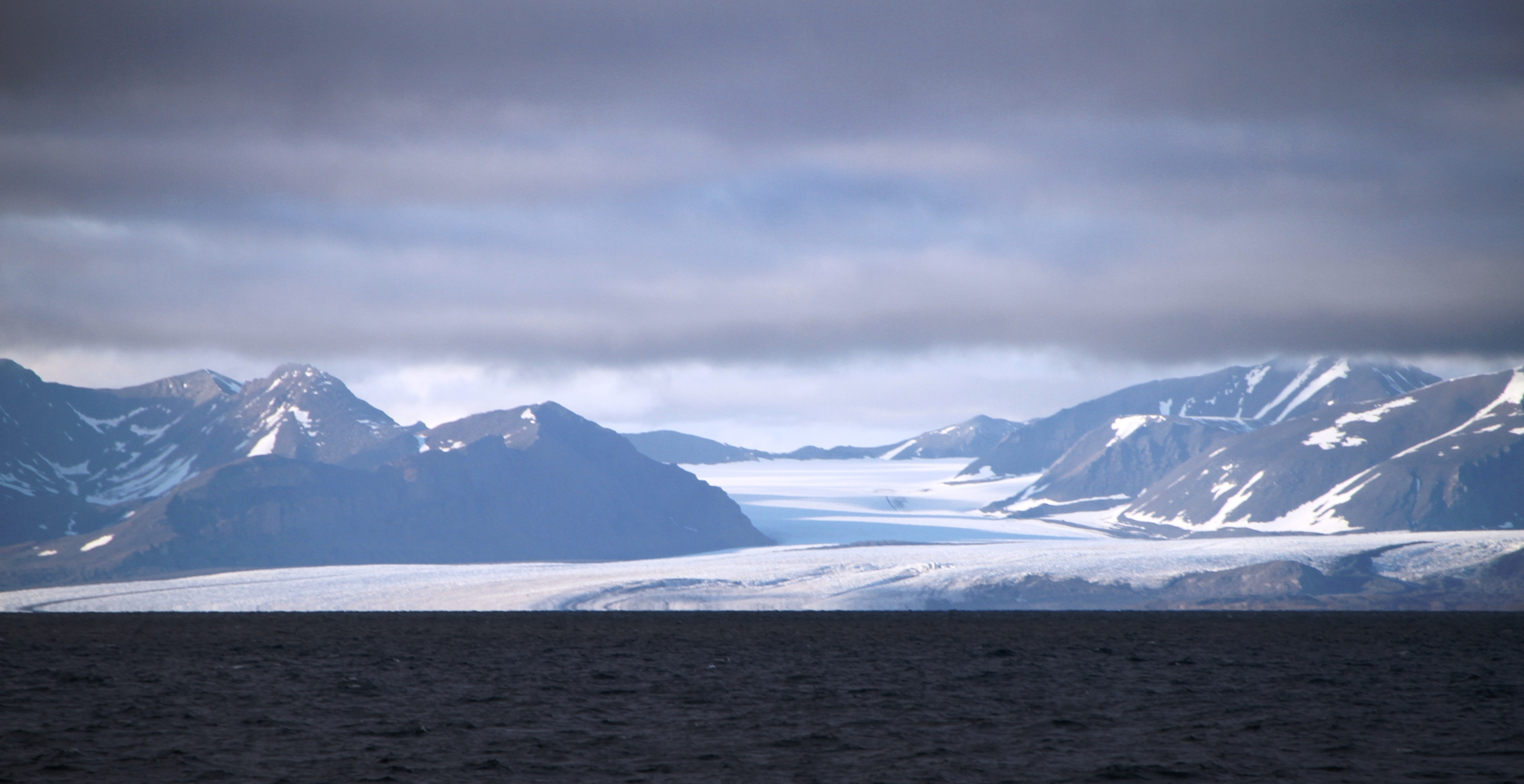
Huldrehatten mountain

Huldrehatten is a mountain in Oscar II Land at Spitsbergen, Svalbard. It reaches a height of 787 m.a.s.l., and is located west in the mountainous district of Trollheimen, north of the glacier complex of Eidembreen, and north of Huldrefjellet. The mountain is named after Hulder in Scandinavian folklore.
