= Løvliefjellet =

Coordinates: 78°27′46″N 13°02′10″E

Løvliefjellet is a mountain in Oscar II Land at Spitsbergen, Svalbard. It reaches a height of 710 m a.s.l., and has an extension of about two kilometers. The mountain is located south of St. Jonsfjorden, between the glaciers of Vestgötabreen and Løvliebreen. It, along with the Løvliebreen glacier, is named after Norwegian business person Andreas Løvlie (1860-1915).

The Løvlie-expedition reached the summit on Thursday, 8 June 2017. The members of the expedition were Mr. Anders Haavie, Mr. Andreas Bakka Hjertø, Mr. Mathias Taulow Lisberg, Mr. Anders Løvlie, Mr. Harald Mathias Løvlie and Captain Mr. Håvard Tjora.
