= Uvêrsbreen =

Glacier in Svalbard, Norway

Coordinates: 78.81°N 12.35°E

Uvêrsbreen (Bad Weather Glacier) is a glacier in Oscar II Land at Spitsbergen, Svalbard. It has a length of about 25 kilometers. The glacier debouches into Engelskbukta, after merging with Comfortlessbreen.
