= Poolepynten =

Headland of Prins Karls Forland, Svalbard

- Cape
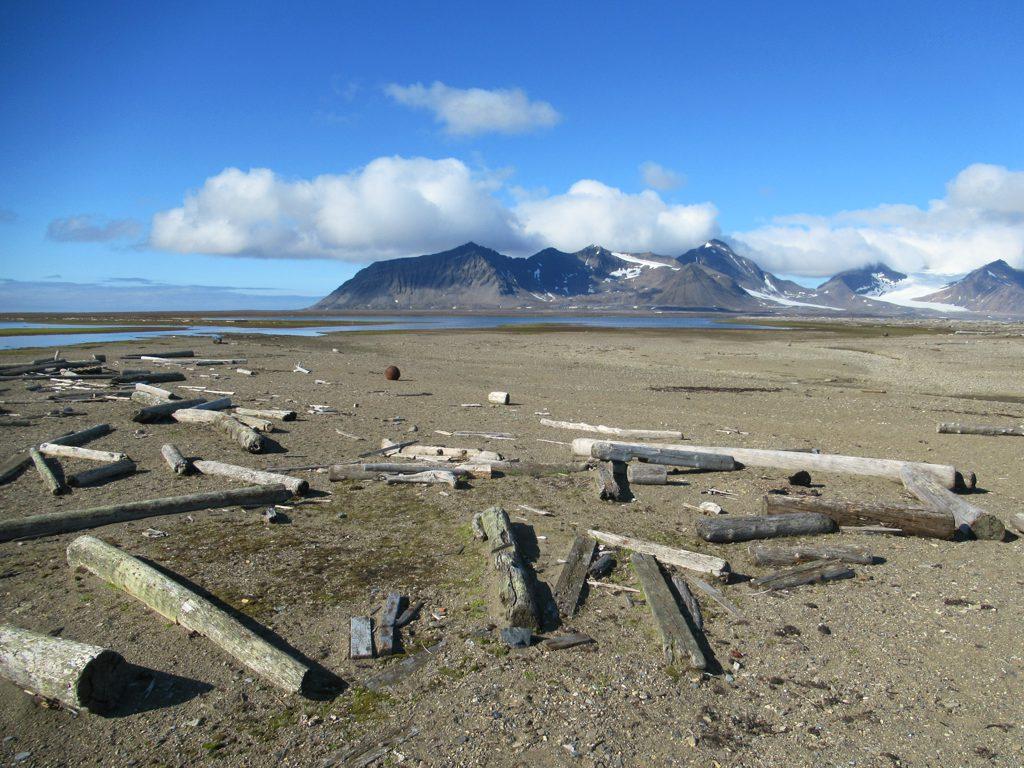
- Poolepynten

- Coordinates: 78°26′41″N 11°53′37″E
- Location: Prins Karls Forland, Svalbard, Norway

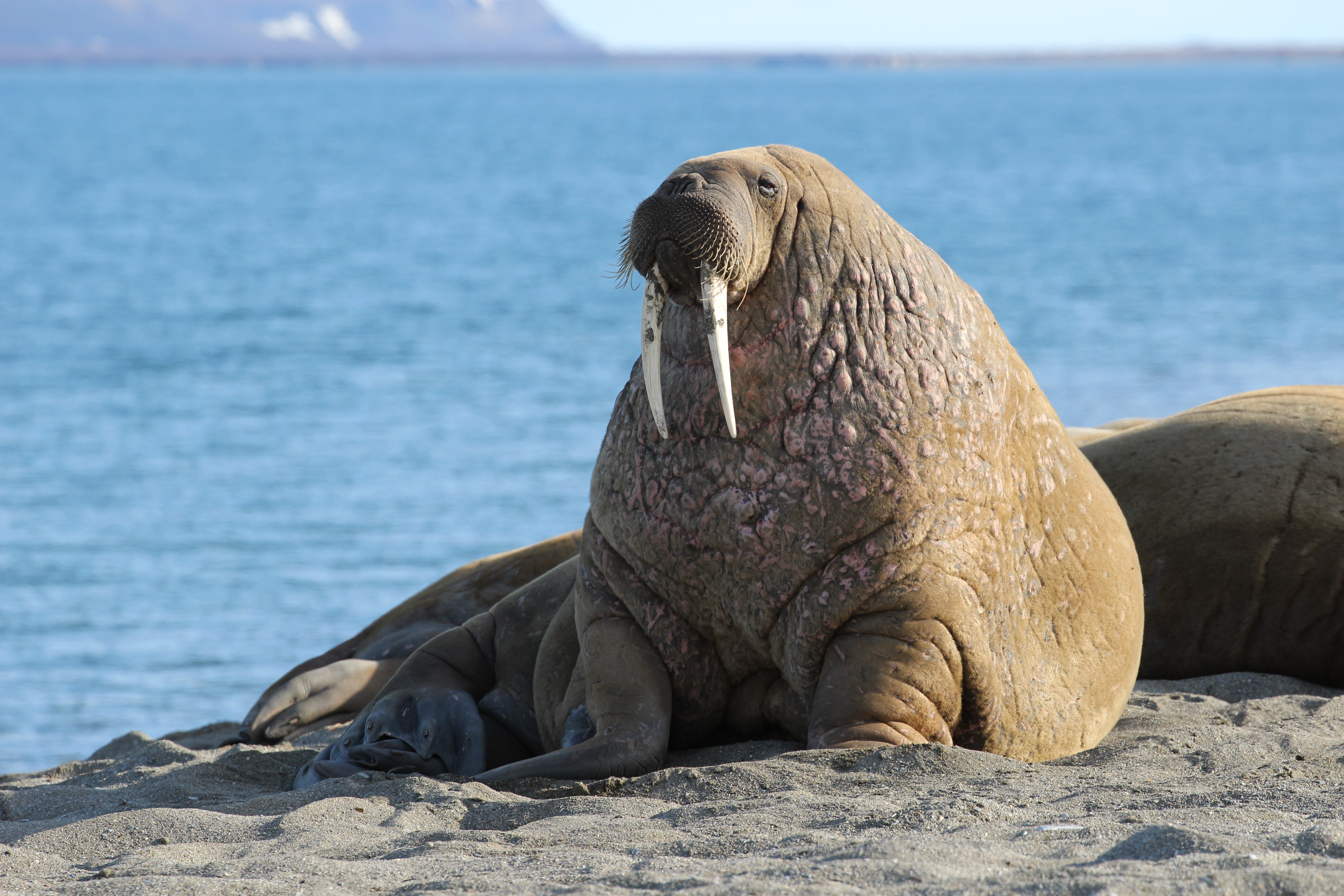
Walrus at Poolepynten.

Poolepynten is a headland at the eastern coast of the Prins Karls Forland at Spitsbergen, Svalbard. It is located within the strait of Forlandsundet. The headland is named after British whaler Jonas Poole. It has a length of about 1.5 kilometers.

Poolepynten lies within the Forlandet National Park.
