= Vestgötabreen =

Glacier in Svalbard, Norway

Coordinates: 78.46°N 12.90°E

Vestgötabreen is a glacier in Oscar II Land at Spitsbergen, Svalbard. It has a length of about seven kilometers, and is located between Løvliefjellet and the mountain ranges of Holmesletfjella and Motalafjella. The glacier is named from the Swedish province of Västergötland.
