= Heksebreen =

Glacier in Svalbard, Norway

Coordinates: 78.395°N 13.372°E

Heksebreen ("The Witch Glacier") is a glacier in Oscar II Land at Spitsbergen, Svalbard. It has a length of about 3.5 kilometers, and is a tributary glacier to Eidembreen. The glacier is located south in the mountainous district of Trollheimen, and is surrounded by the mountains of Heksefjellet, Runebomma, Trollungen and Stortrollet.
