= Løvliebreen =

Glacier in Svalbard, Norway

Coordinates: 78.475°N 13.042°E

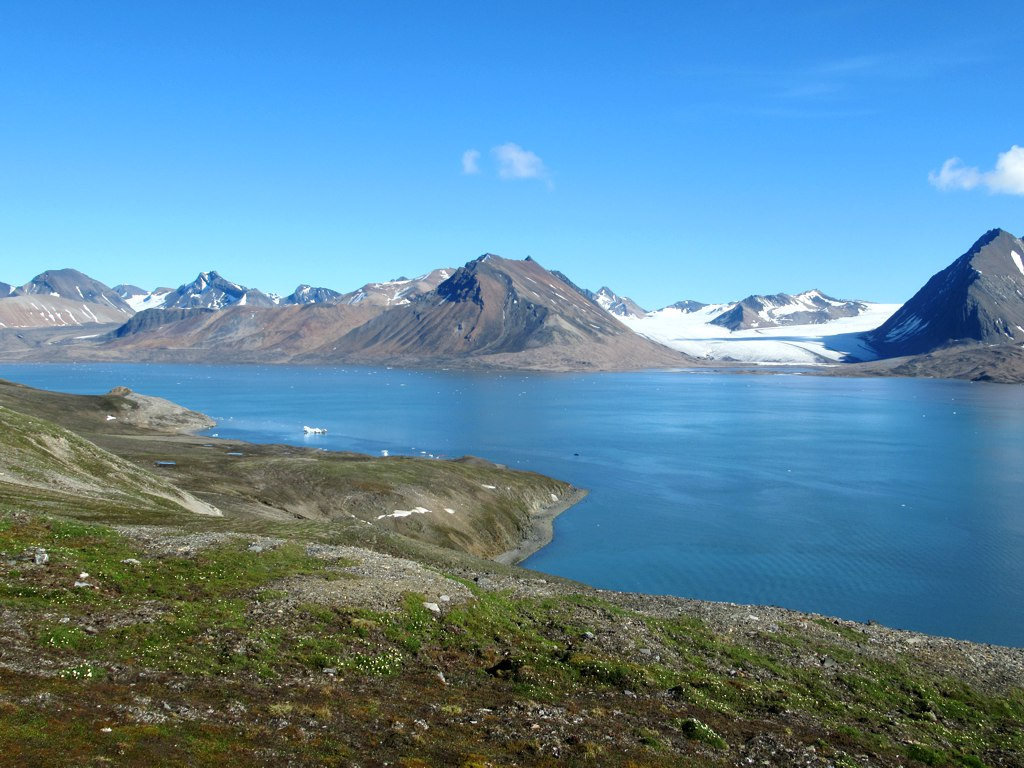
Løvliebreen glacier

Løvliebreen is a glacier in Oscar II Land at Spitsbergen, Svalbard. It has a length of about five kilometers, and is located between the mountain ranges of Gunnar Knudsenfjella and Holmesletfjella. The glacier debouches northwards towards St. Jonsfjorden. It is named after Norwegian businessperson Andreas Løvlie along with the nearby mountain of Løvliefjellet.
