= Trollheimen (Svalbard) =

Coordinates: 78.45°N 13.40°E

Trollheimen ("Home of Trolls") is a mountainous area in Oscar II Land at Spitsbergen, Svalbard, around the glacier of Eidembreen. Among the mountains of Trollheimen are Tussekallen, Runebomma, Heksefjellet, Huldrefjellet, Huldrehatten, Tomtegubben, and parts of Gunnar Knudsenfjella. North of Eidembreen is the glacier of Huldrebreen, and to the south are Heksebreen and Stallobreen.
