= Stallobreen =

Glacier in Svalbard, Norway

Coordinates: 78.374°N 13.280°E

Stallobreen is a glacier in Oscar II Land at Spitsbergen, Svalbard. It has a length of about 4.5 kilometers, and is located between the mountains of Stallofjellet, Sparrefjellet and Heksefjellet, near the glacier complex of Eidembreen.

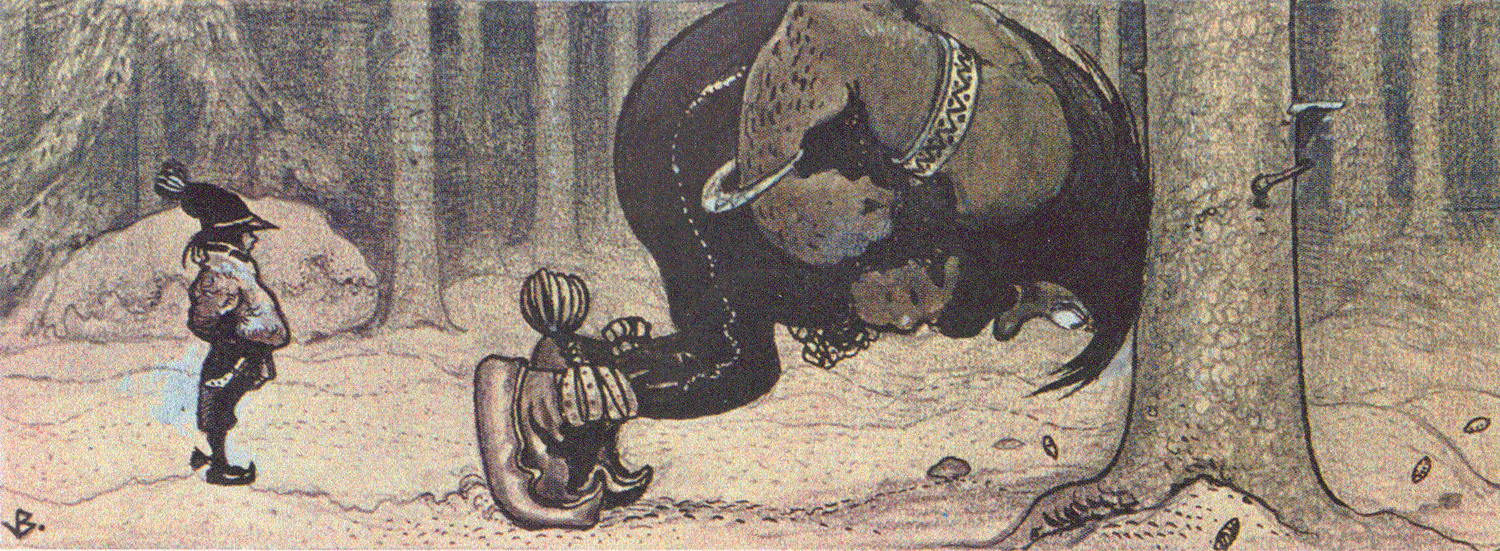
Stallobreen is named after the stallo in Sami folklore.

Stallobreen is named after the stallo creature in Sami folklore.
