= Venernbreen =

Glacier in Svalbard, Norway

Coordinates: 78.345°N 13.360°E

Venernbreen is a glacier in Oscar II Land at Spitsbergen, Svalbard. It has a length of about fifteen kilometers, and is located between the mountains of Sparrefjellet and Kinnefjellet. The glacier is named after the Swedish lake of Vänern.

The nunatak of Tussekallen, in the mountainous district of Trollheimen, is located between the glaciers of Venernbreen and Eidembreen.
