= Jonas Poole =

English explorer and sealer (died 1612)

Jonas Poole (baptised 1566 – 1612) was an early 17th-century English explorer and sealer, and was significant in the history of whaling. He served aboard vessels sent by the Muscovy Company on sealing voyages to Bear Island in the Svalbard archipelago, now owned by Norway, in 1604, 1605, 1606, 1608, and 1609. In 1607 he was among the sailors sent to the New World to establish Jamestown. He returned from his final voyage in 1612. Shortly later, he was murdered in a location between Ratcliff in Tower Hamlets and London.

== Voyages to Bear Island, 1604-1609 ==
He served aboard vessels sent by the Muscovy Company on sealing voyages to Bear Island in 1604, 1605, 1606, 1608, and 1609. In 1607 he was among the sailors sent to the New World to establish Jamestown, in particular being one of the two dozen colonists led by Captain Christopher Newport that explored the upper James River in a pinnace as far as the falls near present-day Richmond, Virginia in late May of that year. In 1606 he was given command of a 20-ton pinnace. In 1608 he piloted the ship Paul, and in 1609 he was master of the ship Lioness.

== Voyages to Spitsbergen, 1610-1612 ==
=== 1610 ===
In 1610 Poole was again sent to Bear Island to hunt walrus, as well as search for a passage towards the North Pole. He was given command of the 70-ton Amity, with a crew of fourteen men and a boy. He bypassed Bear Island altogether, sailing straight for Spitsbergen. While Barentsz had only spent a few weeks exploring Spitsbergen and Hudson less than a month, Poole spent nearly three months (May–August) exploring the west coast and hunting walrus, polar bear, and reindeer there. On 6 May he came within sight of a mountain on the south coast of Spitsbergen, which he named Muscovy Company’s Mount (modern Hornsundtind). He sailed north and sent a skiff into a small fjord. They returned with a piece of reindeer horn, resulting in Poole giving the fjord the name Horn Sound (Hornsund).

During this voyage, he also named Ice Point (Ispynten), Bell Point (for a nearby bell-shaped mountain, now called Kapp Lyell), Bell Sound (Bellsund), Point Partition (Midterhuken), Low Sound (Van Mijenfjorden), Lowsoundness (Lågneset, its Norwegian equivalent), Ice Sound (Isfjorden), Green Harbour (Grønfjorden), Osborne Inlet (St. Jonsfjorden), Black Point (Salpynten), Black Point Isle (Prins Karls Forland), Foul Sound (Forlandsundet), Cape Cold (Kaldneset), Fair Foreland (Fuglehuken), Deer Sound (Kongsfjorden), Close Cove (Krossfjorden), Cross Road (Ebeltofthamna), and Fairhaven (Smeerenburgfjorden).

Poole also obtained "fins" (baleen) and blubber from Bowhead whales that had stranded along the coast, but did not attempt to catch any of the "great store of whales" he saw in these waters, "for the Basques were then the only people who understood whaling."

=== 1611 ===
His report of the number of whales found around Spitsbergen led the Muscovy Company to send two ships there the following year, 1611. One, the 60-ton bark Elizabeth, was sent to accompany the 150-ton Mary Margaret, under Stephen Bennet, on a whaling expedition to the island. Poole was sent as master of the Elizabeth, and was to pilot both vessels. Aboard the Mary Margaret was Thomas Edge, who was to be in charge of the cargoes of both vessels. Among the crew were six expert Basque whalemen from Saint-Jean-de-Luz.

The expedition left Blackwall in April, but in 65° N the two ships were separated by "contrary winds and foul weather." They found each other again in mid-May, sailing together to Cross Road, where they anchored in late May. The Mary Margaret spent the month of June hunting whales and walruses, while Poole explored to the southwest, searching for Henry Hudson's elusive Hold with Hope. After sighting this land (probably eastern Greenland) around 74°, he sailed northward for Bear Island, where he anchored on 29 June.

In late July, while riding at anchor on the north side of the island, Poole came into contact with three sailors sent by Edge and Bennet. They related to him the loss of the Mary Margaret in Foul Sound, which had been driven ashore by ice. He was told that there were thirty men who had landed on the south side of the island in three boats, while two other boats carrying nine men had parted company with them off Horn Sound.

Poole sailed to the south side of the island, picked up the men, and sailed north to Spitsbergen. Coming to Foul Sound he found the Mary Margaret's other men, who had been carried there by an interloper from Hull, the Hopewell, under Thomas Marmaduke. Here, on 7 August, while transferring the cargo of the stricken Mary Margaret, the Elizabeth, not having enough in her hold to ballast herself, was capsized, nearly taking Poole with her. Poole was in the hold when the accident occurred, and twice while trying to climb through the hatches barrels of beer and "diverse other things" knocked him down. By "swimming and crawling" he was able to get out of the bark and to the surface where a boat rescued him. Poole said his "head [was] broke to the skull, and my brow that one might see the bare bones, and by mine ear I had a sore wound, likewise the ribs on my right side were all broken and sore bruised, and the collar bone of my left shoulder is broken, besides my back was so sore, that I could not suffer any man to touch it."

Climbing into three boats, the men rowed to the Hopewell, asking Marmaduke for help, but he refused, reportedly arming his men with pikes and lances to keep Poole and his men from boarding. Edge and other men finally convinced Marmaduke to carry them home, but only after agreeing to pay him.

=== 1612 ===
In 1612 Jonas Poole again sailed to Spitsbergen on a whaling expedition. Two ships were sent, the 160-ton Whale, under John Russell, and the 180-ton Sea Horse, under Thomas Edge. Poole served aboard the latter, probably as pilot.

The expedition left in early April, arriving at Bear Island in early May. On 25 May they came into Foul Sound. The next day two ships came into the sound. One was a ship sent from Holland, which they had met with earlier off Bear Island. The other was an interloper from England, the Diana, of London, under Thomas Bustion of Wapping Wall. Both sailed away the following day. In early June Poole met with another interloper, the Hopewell of Hull, again under Thomas Marmaduke, which may have been fitted out this year to hunt for whales.

By early June the Basque whalemen—probably recruited from St. Jean de Luz—had already caught several whales. In late June Poole said there were so many whales in the sound that he could not count them. On 30 June he reported that "there lay abundance of huge Whales in the harbour about our ships." "All this day whales lay so thick about the ship, that some ran against our Cables, some against the Ship, and one against the Rudder. One lay under our beakhead and slept there a long while." The ships returned to London later that year with 180 tons of oil from the capture of seventeen bowhead whales and two walruses.

At the end of the voyage, Poole was reportedly "miserably and basely murdered" between Ratcliff in Tower Hamlets and London.

== Legacy ==
Many of the names that Jonas Poole gave to features on the west coast of Spitsbergen, most importantly Hornsund, Bellsund, and Isfjorden, still retain their name. The names of other features, through modern blunders in map-making and for other reasons, have been changed or altogether forgotten. Poolepynten (Poole Point), on the southeastern coast of Prins Karls Forland (Prince Charles Foreland), was named in his honor.
