= Austgötabreen =

Glacier in Svalbard, Norway

Coordinates: 78.44°N 13.05°E

Austgötabreen is a glacier in Oscar II Land at Spitsbergen, Svalbard. The glacier has a length of about six kilometers, and is located between Huldrefjellet, Huldrehatten and Motalafjella. It is named after the Swedish county of Östergötland.
