= Pietro Della Valle =

Italian composer, musicologist, traveller and author (1586–1652)

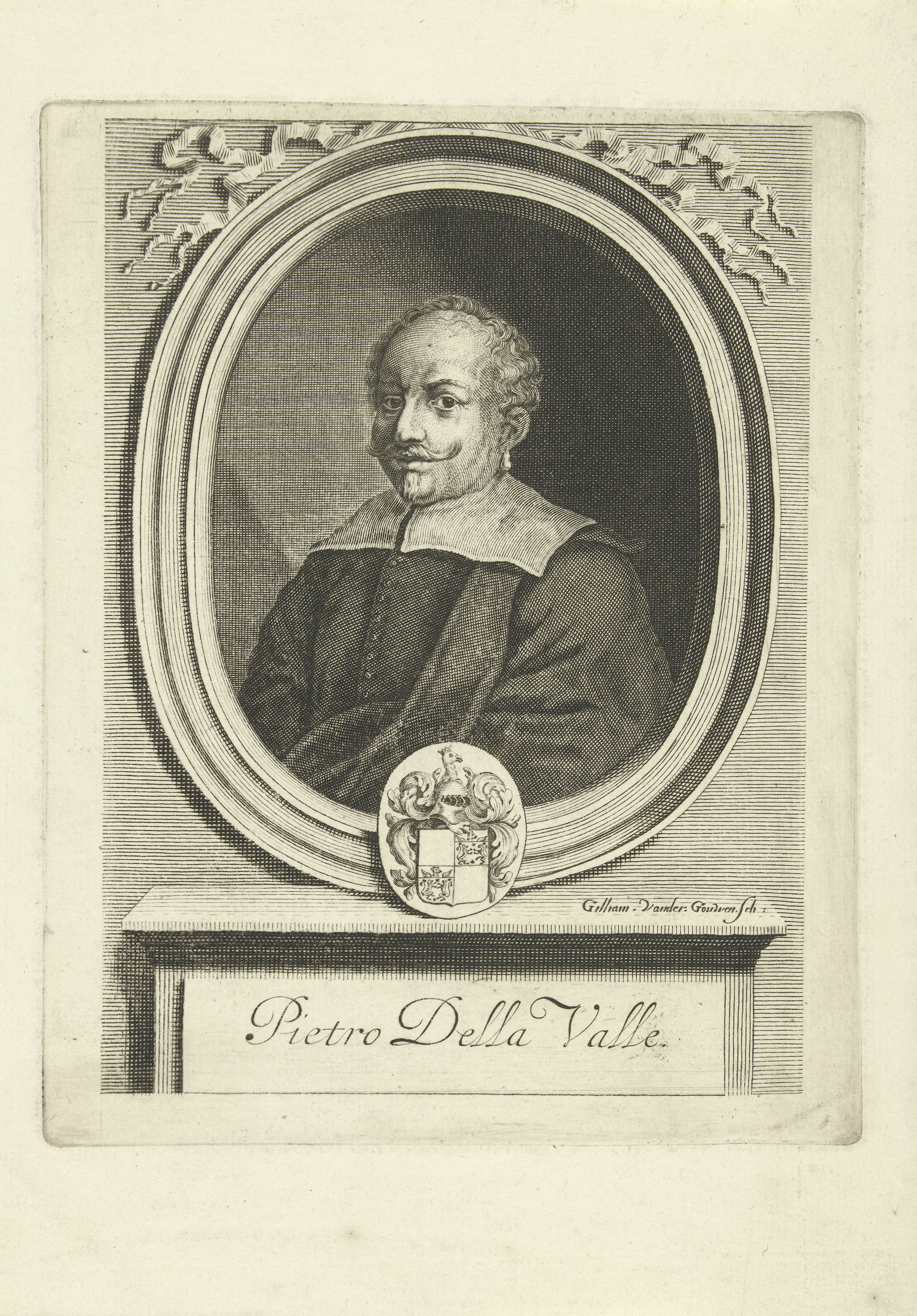
Pietro Della Valle

Pietro Della Valle (Latin: Petrus a Valle; 2 April 1586 – 21 April 1652), also written Pietro della Valle, was an Italian composer, musicologist, and author who travelled throughout Asia during the 17th century. His travels took him to the Holy Land, the Middle East, Northern Africa, and as far as India.

== Life ==
Pietro Della Valle was born in Rome on 2 April 1586, to a wealthy and noble family. His early life was spent in the pursuit of literature and arms. He was a cultivated man, who knew Latin, Greek, classical mythology, and the Bible. He also became a member of the Roman Accademia degli Umoristi, and acquired some reputation as a versifier and rhetorician. In 1611, he took part in a Spanish naval expedition against the Barbary States.

When Pietro was disappointed in love and began to consider suicide, Mario Schipano, a professor of medicine in Naples, suggested the idea of travelling in the East. It was Schipano who received a sort of diary in letters from Pietro's travels.

Before leaving Naples, Pietro took a vow to make a pilgrimage to the Holy Land. So, at age 28, he left Venice by boat on 8 June 1614 and reached Constantinople; he remained there for more than a year and acquired a good knowledge of Turkish and a little Arabic. On 25 September 1615, he went to Alexandria. Because he was a nobleman of distinction, he travelled with a suite of nine persons, and with every advantage due to his rank. From Alexandria he went on to Cairo. After traveling south to Saqqara, he was guided by a local man to a necropolis where he discovered mummy portraits, the first modern westerner to see these realistic Greek painted portraits from ancient Roman Egypt. After an excursion to Mount Sinai, left Cairo for the Holy Land. He arrived there on 8 March 1616, in time to take part in the Easter celebrations at Jerusalem.

After visiting the holy sites, Pietro travelled from Damascus to Aleppo. After seeing a portrait of the beautiful Assyrian Christian Sitti Maani Gioerida, daughter of a Nestorian Catholic father and an Armenian mother, he went to Baghdad and married her a month later. While in the Middle East, he made one of the first modern records of the location of ancient Babylon and provided "remarkable descriptions" of the site. He also brought back to Europe inscribed bricks from Nineveh and Ur, some of the first examples of cuneiform available to modern Europeans. At that time Baghdad was being contested between Turkey and Iran during the frequent Ottoman-Persian Wars, so he had to leave Baghdad on 4 January 1617. Accompanied by his wife Maani, he proceeded to Persia, and visited Hamadan and Isfahan. In the summer of 1618, he joined Shah Abbas in a campaign in northern Persia. Here he was well received at court and treated as the Shah's guest.

When Shah ʿAbbās returned to winter quarters at Faraḥābād, Della Valle, who was unwell, went to Isfahan, where he hoped the Augustinians and Carmelites would restore him to health. On his return to Isfahan he began to think of going back home through India, rather than endanger himself again in Turkey. However, the state of his health and the war between Persia and the Portuguese at Ormuz generated problems. In October 1621 he left Isfahan, visited Persepolis and Shiraz and made his way to the coast. While waiting for transport, his wife died shortly after delivering a stillborn child. It was not until January 1623 that he found a passage for Surat on the English ship Whale, Captain Nicholas Woodcock.

He sojourned in India until November 1624, his headquarters being Surat and Goa. In India, Pietro Della Valle was introduced to the King Vekatappa Nayaka of Keladi, South India by Vithal Shenoy, the chief administrator of those territories. The accounts of his travels are one of the most important sources of history for the region.

He was at Muscat in January 1625, and at Basra in March. In May he started by the desert route to Aleppo, and boarded on a French ship at Alexandretta. He reached Cyprus and finally Rome on 28 March 1626. There, he was received with many honours, not only in literary circles, but also from Pope Urban VIII, who appointed him a gentleman of his bedchamber. The rest of his life was uneventful; he married his second wife, Mariuccia (Tinatin de Ziba), a Georgian orphan of a noble family. She had been adopted by his first wife as a child, had travelled with him, and was the mother of fourteen children. He died in Rome on 21 April 1652, and is buried at his family's burial vault at Santa Maria in Ara Coeli.

By 1665, the portion of his "Travels" dealing with India and with his return had been translated into English. They contain accounts of his discussions with "Hindoo" Brahmans about whether the Egyptians or Indians first came up with the concept of reincarnation, a dialogue with a woman who invited him to her upcoming sati, a description of the barefoot 'Queen of Olaza', who was out on the embankments giving directions to her engineers—and many other bits of first-rate ethnography.

Apart from his activities as an ethnographer, Della Valle was also a composer and a writer of theoretical treatises on music. He composed several dialogues (actually brief oratorios) on biblical subjects. His only preserved work is an oratorio composed for l'Oratorio del Croficisso di San Marcello, where he experiments with musical modes and scales inspired by ancient music theory. For this purpose, he developed two new instruments, such as a "violone panharmonico" and a "cembalo triharmonico". Notwithstanding his interest in ancient musical practices, in his theoretical writings on music (e.g. "Della musica dell'età nostra che non è punto inferiore, anzi è migliore di quella dell'età passata", Rome 1640, and "Note … sopra la musica antica e moderna, indirizzato al Sig.r Nicolò Farfaro", 1640/41), he praises the modern music culture in contemporary Rome and defended the modern music against the criticism of Nicolò Farfaro, an Italian musician of his times.

Pietro Della Valle also wrote texts and librettos for several musical spectacles, such as "Il carro di fedeltà d'Amore", (music by his teacher of harpsichord Paolo Quagliati, performed in Rome in 1606 and printed in 1611), and "La valle rinverdita" (written in celebration of the birth of his first child in 1629, now lost).

== Works ==
- Il Carro di Fideltà d’amore (music by Paolo Quagliati), Robletti, Roma, 1611.
- "Funeral Oration on his Wife Maani", whose remains he brought with him to Rome and buried there (1627)
- Account of Shah Abbas (1628)
- Discorso sulla musica dell'età nostra, Roma, 1640.
- The Travels in Persia (2 parts) were published by his sons in 1658, and the third part (India) in 1663.
- Viaggi di Pietro Della Valle il pellegrino, con minuto ragguaglio di tutte le cose notabili osservate in essi: descritti da lui medesimo in 54 lettere familiari all'erudito suo amico Mario Schipano, divisi in tre parti cioè: la Turchia, la Persia e l'India. Colla vita e ritratto dell'autore. Roma 1650–1658, Torino 1843.
- Diario di viaggio in Persia (1617-1623), a cura di Mario Vitalone. ISMEO, Roma 2023. ISBN 978-88-66872-55-9

== Legacy ==
In Farmanieh, Tehran, the public Italian language center administered by Italian Embassy, is named after Pietro Della Valle.

On 4 November 2016, an official commemorating ceremony of Della Valle's travelogue was held by Bukhara magazine in Tehran, attended by Italian ambassador Mauro Conciatori.

== Book collector ==
Pietro Della Valle was also a famous book collector. "In a letter written in Damascus and Aleppo, dated June 15, 1616, Della Valle described his delight at finding some rare Samaritan manuscripts, some of them with glosses in Arabic, for sale."

== See also ==
- García de Silva Figueroa
