= Hornsundtind =

Mountain in Svalbard, Norway

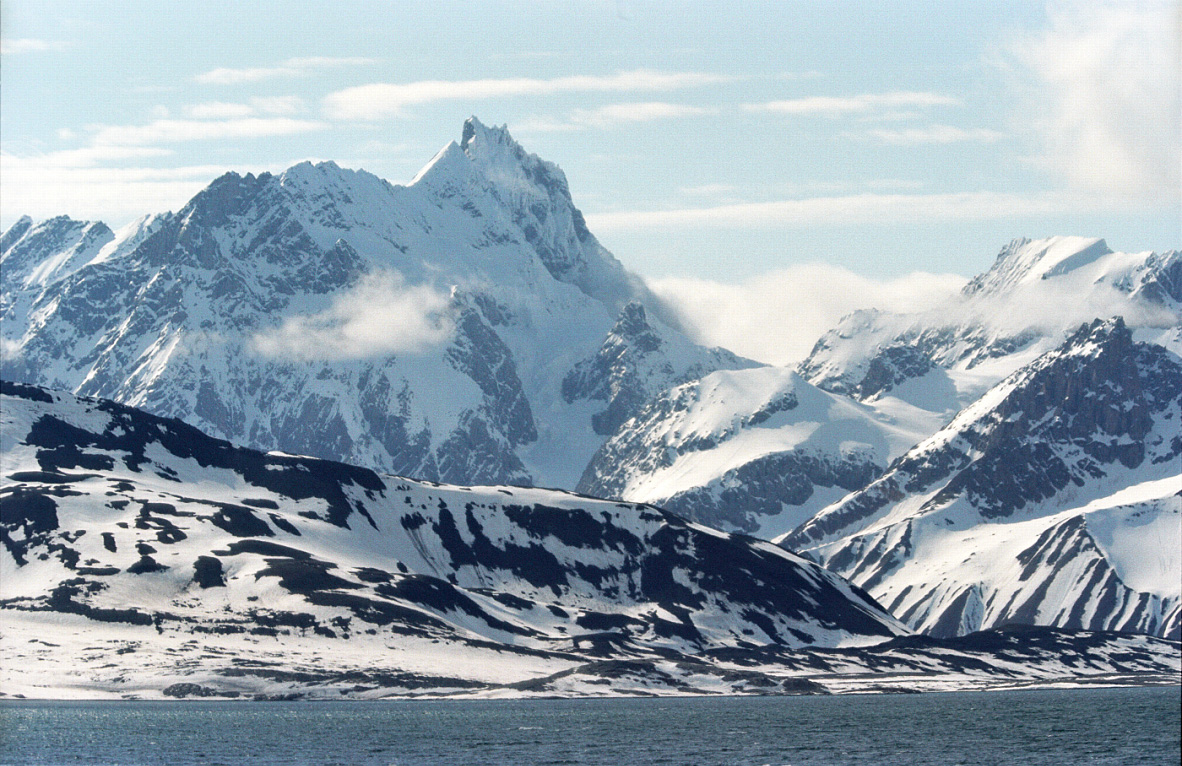
- Hornsundtind is located at the southern part of Spitsbergen, south of Hornsund

Highest point
- Elevation: 1,431 m (4,695 ft)
- Coordinates: 76.9206°N 16.1411°E

Geography
- Location within Svalbard
- Location: Spitsbergen, Svalbard

Climbing
- First ascent: 1938

Hornsundtind is a mountain south of the fjord Hornsund at the southern part of Spitsbergen, Svalbard. Its height is 1,431 metres.
