= Kinnekulle =

Table mountain in Sweden

Highest point
- Elevation: 306 m (1,004 ft)
- Coordinates: 58°36′00″N 13°24′40″E

Geography
- Location: Götene Municipality, Västra Götaland County, Sweden
- Parent range: Westrogothian Mesas

Sunset over Kinnekulle, from the east side

Kinnekulle is a flat-topped mountain in the county of Västergötland, southwestern Sweden, on the eastern shore of lake Vänern. Its highest point is 306 m (1,004 ft) above sea level. The mountain is 14 km (8.7 mi) long and 7 km (4.3 mi) wide at the top.

== History ==
The historic town and church of Husaby are located on the south side of the Kinnekulle. Tradition says that Olof Skötkonung, the first Christian King of Sweden, was baptized here in 1008 at a well located just north of the church. The mountain of Kinnefjellet at Spitsbergen, Svalbard, is named after Kinnekulle.

The Kinnekulle area has been a focal point for archaeological research due to its concentration of Late Neolithic (c. 2200–1700 BCE) and Early Bronze Age (c. 1700–1100 BCE) gallery graves. The mountain's limestone plateau contains at least 20 such graves, although the broader region has yielded relatively few stray finds from these periods.

== Geology ==
Kinnekulle's highest elevation is 306 m (1,004 ft) above sea level. The summit plateau measures approximately 14 km (8.7 mi) in length and 7 km (4.3 mi) in width. It is one of several erosional remnants of Paleozoic sedimentary rock that appear as "islands" in the otherwise Precambrian crystalline landscape of southern Sweden. Its flat summit is the result of a resistant diabase sill that shields the softer underlying strata from erosion. Despite its enormous size, Kinnekulle is actually the smaller remnant of a much larger plateau, long ago worn down to a flat plain. Some 550 million years ago, in the Neoproterozoic, the bottom-most rock of the plateau was under the sea. Layers of sedimentary rock formed over that layer from sand, mud, and sea animal remains.

The geological sequence includes sedimentary rocks dating from the Cambrian to the Silurian, overlying a Precambrian basement. These include Cambrian sandstones, alum shales, Ordovician Orthoceratite limestone, and Silurian slates. The limestone was deposited in an epicontinental sea that once covered the Baltoscandian Shield and is characterized by extremely low sedimentation rates, punctuated by hardgrounds indicating prolonged periods of non-deposition.

About 200 million years ago, during the Mesozoic era, the area was uplifted above the sea. tectonic activity forced molten lava through the sedimentary rock, creating sheetlike layers of diabase. These layers, when present, protected the softer sedimentary rock beneath them from erosion, resulting in mesa-like mountains such as Kinnekulle and its neighbours.

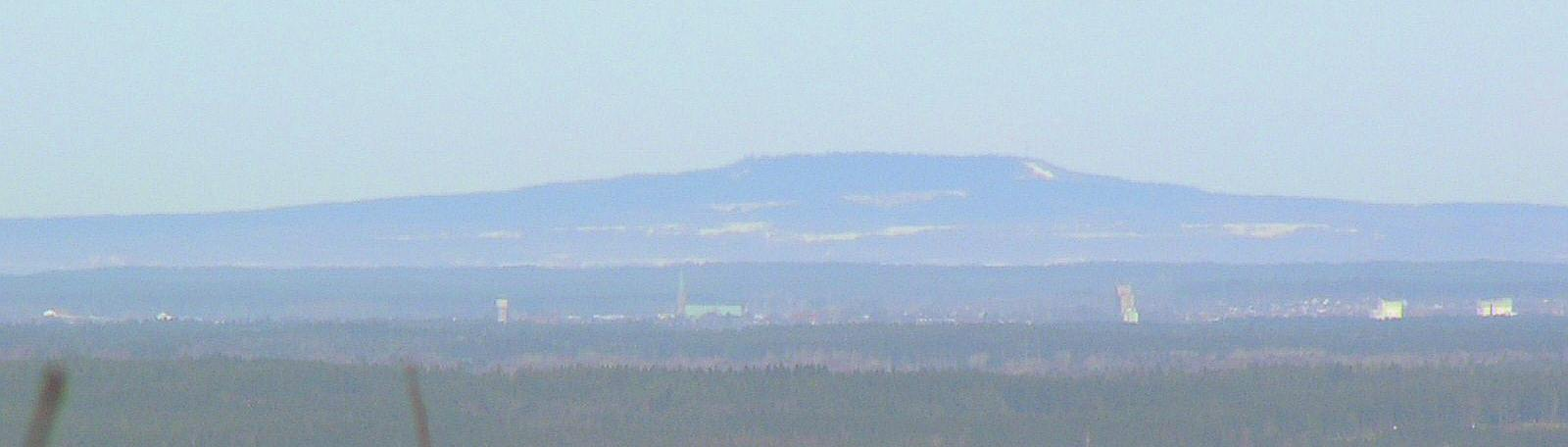
Kinnekulle's characteristic profile in winter
