= Christian Sparre =

Norwegian admiral and politician (1859–1940)

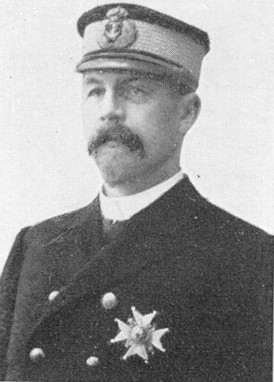
Christian Sparre.

Christian Sparre (30 July 1859 – 4 November 1940) was a Norwegian Commanding Admiral and Member of Parliament. The mountain of Sparrefjellet at Spitsbergen is named after him.

Christian Herman Sparre was born in Høland Municipality (now part of Aurskog-Høland Municipality) in Akershus county, Norway. His father, Ole Jacob Louis Sparre (1831–1889), was a physician and Member of Parliament. Sparre grew up in Rollag Municipality in Buskerud and in Strandebarm Municipality in Hardanger. He graduated from the Norwegian Naval Academy in 1881. In addition to his maritime education, Sparre was a student at the Norwegian Military Academy in 1884.

Sparre had a long and productive career. From 1881, he was a lieutenant in the Royal Norwegian Navy. He was promoted to first lieutenant in 1884 and to captain in 1894. From 1898 to 1900, he was chief of the Naval Academy. In 1900, he was appointed commander and the following year he was promoted to vice admiral in the Navy. He served as commanding admiral in Norway from 1901 to 1909.

He served on the Council of State Division in Stockholm from 1900 to 1901. From 1907 to 1910 he was a member of the city council in Christiania (now Oslo). He was elected to the Norwegian Parliament from Horten in Vestfold 1913 and 1916, where he was deputy chairman of the Military Committee.

Sparre received a wide range of Norwegian and foreign orders and medals. He was appointed Commander of the 1st class Order of St. Olav in 1903.

Additionally, Sparre wrote crime fiction under the pen-name of Fredrik Viller.

Military offices
Preceded by	Commanding Admiral in Norway; 1901–1909	Succeeded by Karl Friedrich Griffin Dawes
