= Thomas Marmaduke =

English explorer

Thomas Marmaduke was an English explorer, sealer, and whaler in the early 17th century.

== Career ==
In a list dated from September 1600 Marmaduke is mentioned as being a younger brother of the Hull Trinity House. He was master of one of the two Hull interlopers (a ship that trespasses on a trade monopoly by conducting unauthorized trade) sent to Bjørnøya in 1609. It was claimed that in this year, sailing in the Heartsease, he "discovered" Spitsbergen; although there is no evidence for this claim, and the island had already been discovered by the Dutch in 1596. On this claim the merchants of Hull based their rights to fish for whales in Spitsbergen in subsequent decades.

In 1611, Marmaduke was again sent up, this time in the interloper Hopewell of Hull. He hunted walrus, or "sea morses" (as they were called). In July, Marmaduke met with two shallops of the Mary Margaret, a ship sent by the Muscovy Company to hunt whales, in Horn Sound. Their ship had been crushed by ice in or near Cove Comfortless (Engelskbukta), north of Horn Sound. They led him north to the bay in order to salvage their goods. Later, the Elizabeth, Jonas Poole, master and pilot, sailed into the bay and attempted to shift his cargo to enable him to accommodate the goods of the Mary Margaret, but in doing so his ship capsized, forcing the crew of both the Mary Margaret and the Elizabeth to sail home in the Hopewell. In this year or the next he was claimed to have discovered Jan Mayen and named it Trinity Island. There is no cartographical or written evidence for this alleged discovery.

Marmaduke again sailed as master of the Hopewell in 1612. Although several secondary sources state that he was sent to catch whales, there is no evidence that he intended to do so or was even fitted out for it. He may have again been sent up to catch walrus. Poole said he reached 82° N this season, but this seems unlikely. All we know is that he carried off the post and arms set up on Spitsbergen's northwest coast by Barentsz in 1596, and that he reached Red Beach (the shore of Breibogen) and as far as Gråhuken (Grey Hook) at the western entrance of Wijdefjorden, where, in early August 1614, Robert Fotherby and William Baffin found a cross engraved with the name Laurence Prestwood, as well as two or three others, dated 17 August 1612. In 1613, he sailed for the Muscovy Company in the Matthew (250 tons), vice-admiral of the English whaling fleet. Using a seized Dutch vessel, Marmaduke explored as far as Fairhaven. On speaking with the English admiral, Benjamin Joseph, on his intentions of sailing around Point Lookout (Sørkapp) for further exploration, he was told "that he had hindered the voyage more by his absence than his discoveries would profit" and was ordered to return to the Foreland. He apparently disobeyed Joseph's orders, as he was said to have discovered Hopen this year, naming it after his former command, the Hopewell. This supposed discovery is shown on the Muscovy Company's Map (1625), where the date 1613 is given beside the island.

He sailed once more for the Company as master of the Heartsease the next season (1614), exploring northeastwards over the northwest coast of Spitsbergen at least as far as Gråhuken, where Fotherby and Baffin encountered some of his crew in a shallop. In 1617 Marmaduke petitioned to King James that he could prove that the shortest route to Cathay (China) was to the north-east. He asked if he would be able to do this at the king's charge, and if not, to undertake it himself. Whether his proposal was accepted is not known. The same year whalers from Vlissingen were said to have met him at Bear Island, while one of the Muscovy Company's ships met with him off Edgeøya, reporting that Marmaduke then sailed for Hopen. The remains of a whaling station are said to exist at Koefoedodden on the southern tip of Hopen. It may have belonged to Marmaduke. In 1619 he attempted to sail around Sørkapp, but poor ice conditions forced him into Hornsund.

== Legacy ==
A cove on the west coast of Edgeøya was named Duke's Cove in his honor. The Dutch corrupted it to Dusko and finally Disko. It now appears as Diskobukta, but apparently misplaced.

In the 2007 novel The Solitude of Thomas Cave, by Georgina Harding, Marmaduke appears as captain of the Heartsease, which is sent to Edgeøya in 1616. Here he leaves the book's title character, who, on a wager, successfully over-winters on the island.
