= How the Stalos were Tricked =

Saami fairy tale

How the Stalos were Tricked is a Saami fairy tale collected by J. C. Poestion in Lapplandische Märchen.

It was later adapted by Andrew Lang in his collection of folklore and fairy tales,The Orange Fairy Book.

== Synopsis ==
A boy saw a giant man in the woods, and his mother identified it as a Stalo, a man-eater.
