= Robert Fotherby =

English explorer and whaler (died 1646)

Robert Fotherby (died 1646) was an early 17th-century English explorer and whaler. From 1613 to 1615 he worked for the Muscovy Company, and from 1615 until his death for the East India Company.

== Family ties ==
There was a family of Fotherbys in Grimsby, Lincolnshire. Robert Fotherby may have belonged to this Grimsby stock.

== Whaling voyages to Spitsbergen (Svalbard), 1613–1615 ==
=== 1613 ===
Fotherby was among the crew of seven ships sent by the Muscovy Company to Greenland (Spitsbergen) in May 1613. He served as master's mate aboard the ship Matthew (250 tons), vice-admiral of the fleet. The only notable occurrence Fotherby spoke of in his journal was that he ascended a glacier in Josephbukta, a bay on the western side of Recherche Fjord. This is significant in that this is the first recorded glacier expedition in Spitsbergen's history. The glacier in question was probably Renardbreen (Fox glacier).

=== 1614 ===
In this year Fotherby sailed as master's mate in the ship Thomasine, one of the two ships sent by the Muscovy Company to explore the coast of Spitsbergen. The ship left England early in May and had arrived in the latitude of 75° N, just south of Spitsbergen, by the end of the month.

On 22 June Fotherby came into Magdalenefjorden, claiming it and the small sheltered bay on its southern shore for King James I of England by setting up the King's Arms on a wooden cross. He named the former Maudlin Sound, the latter Trinity Harbor.

Several times in July and August, Fotherby, along with William Baffin, pilot of the Thomasine, using two shallops, explored the northern coast of Spitsbergen. They explored and named Raudfjorden Red-cliff Sound (its modern name is merely a corruption of this earlier namesake). Fotherby named the cape separating its two southern branches Point Deceit (now called Narreneset, its Norwegian equivalent), and its eastern entrance Point Welcome (which modern maps have misplaced further east). The large, open bay to the east he named Broad bay (Breibogen, its Norwegian equivalent), and its shore Red Beach. Along Red Beach Fotherby saw evidence of the presence of Thomas Marmaduke's 1612 expedition by the fires his crew had made. The eastern point of Red Beach, now wrongly marked Velkomstpynten on modern charts, Fotherby named Redbeach Point. The two fjords (Liefdefjorden and Woodfjorden) south of Breibogen and Reinsdyerflya he marked Wiches Sound, named after the London shipowner and merchant Richard Wyche.

Climbing atop a high hill along the eastern shore of Woodfjorden in early August, Fotherby and Baffin saw a long, wide bay (Wijdefjorden) and a point to the northeast (Verlegenhuken). He called the former Sir Thomas Smith's Inlet (it apparently was named earlier). Seeing another shallop heading towards Gråhuken, or Castlins Point as Fotherby named it, they went north, meeting at the aforementioned point. Here they found a cross set up by Marmaduke's men in 1612. It had Laurence Prestwood, as well as two or three other names, engraved on it. It bore the date 17 August 1612. By traveling overland and by sea they made their way around Gråhuken and several leagues into Wijdefjorden, where, because of thick ice, they were forced to travel solely overland to explore further into the fjord. Walking along its western shore, Fotherby and Baffin traveled almost a league further, where, from a point of land jutting into the fjord, they were able to see the end of Wijdefjorden several leagues to the south. The ice would not allow them to explore further, so they made their way back to their ship, which was anchored in the southern harbor of Fairhaven (Smeerenburgfjorden).

They attempted to sail the ship around the northern coast of Spitsbergen, but could only reach the mouth of Wijdefjorden before being forced to turn back because of the ice. The Thomasine left the latitude of Spitsbergen in early September and arrived back in England early the next month.

=== 1615 ===
In 1615 Fotherby again was part of an exploratory expedition, this time commanding his own ship, the pinnace Richard (20 tons). Although he failed to find Henry Hudson's elusive Hold-with-Hope (generally believed to be part of the east coast of Greenland), he did stumble upon Jan Mayen, becoming the first documented English expedition to reach the island. Thinking it was a new discovery, he named it Sir Thomas Smith's Island, and the large volcano, Beerenberg, dominating the northeastern part of the island, Mount Hackluyt. The island may have been discovered the year before by the Dutchman Fopp Gerritsz., sailing in command of a whaleship sent out by the Englishman John Clarke, of Dunkirk.

== East India Company ==
In October 1615, after his return from this expedition, a court's minute of the East India Company stated that Fotherby was "a very fit person to be employed upon a discovery for the south side of the Cape." We next find him appointed as the company's overseer for making cordage in Deptford in November 1618. Three years later he was said to be "confirmed in his place and salary." In August of the same year he moved to Blackwall Yard to act as the company's agent there, and in October 1624 he had his wages increased. Fotherby is mentioned as the clerk at Blackwall in August 1627, and again in August 1639, in reference to his son, also named Robert, where he is said to be "the Company's old and well deserving servant and clerk at Blackwall". In July 1644, he is mentioned as one of the men chosen as officers of the company: "Robert Fotherby, clerk at Blackwall". In September of the same year the court minutes of the Company stated that Fotherby had served as the company's "clerk and storekeeper at Blackwall Yard" the last twenty-six years. He is last mentioned in the company's service in the court minutes of May 1646. In October the Company learned of his death, and on 16th of the same month he was buried. His son died three years later.
