= Mova =

Mova, or mova may refer to:

- Mova (camera system), a multi-camera high resolution facial capture system
- mova, the defunct PDC service of the Japanese cellular operator NTT DoCoMo

== See also ==
- Ukrainian language
- Belarusian language
- Ruthenian language
