= Stallo =

Mythical creature from Sámi folklore

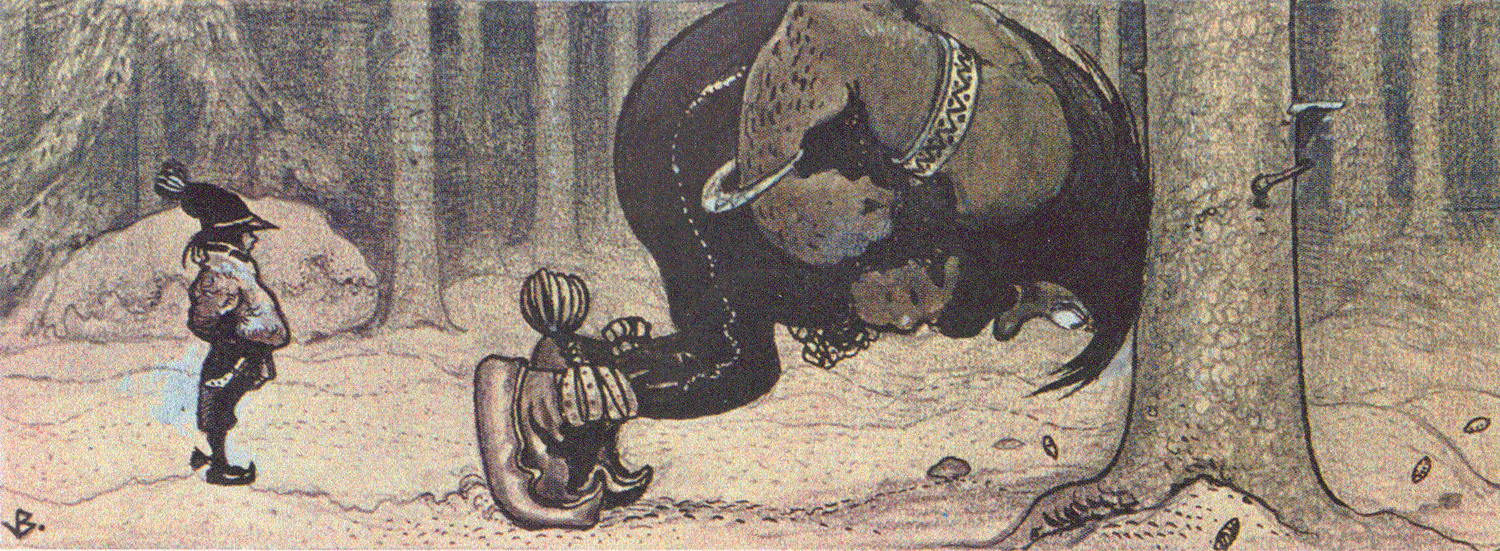
An illustration from John Bauer's folktale Stalo and Kauras

In the folklore of the Sámi, a Stállo (also Staaloe, Stalo or Northern Sami Stállu) is a large, human-like creature who likes to eat people and who therefore is usually in some form of hostilities with a human. Stallos are clumsy and unintelligent, and thus humans often gain the upper hand over them.

The Vindelfjällen Nature Reserve contains the remains of ancient, large building foundations, considered by the Sami to be the remains of Stallo dwellings. There is also a huge stone placed on some small pebbles on top near Lake Giengeljaure named stalostenen, which literally means "the Stallo stone." Legend dictates that a Stallo would have placed a stone here to prove his strength.

== Stallo sites ==
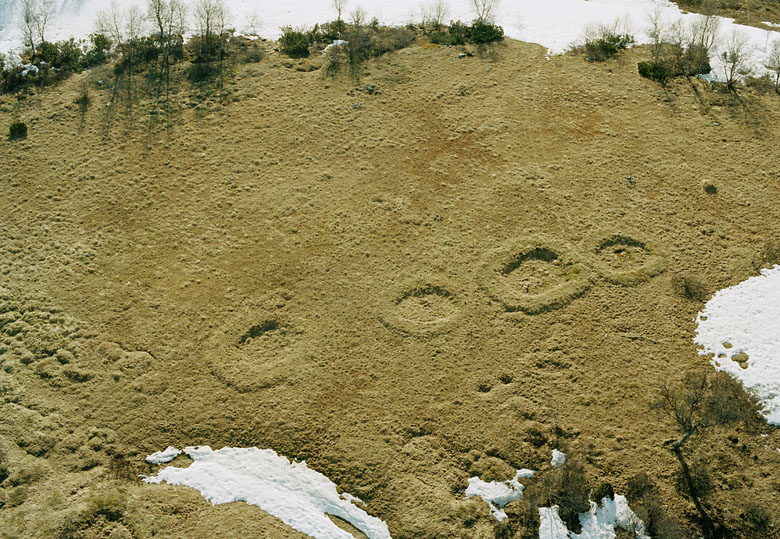
Aerial view of four stallo buildings in Remdalen, Vilhelmina Municipality, Sweden

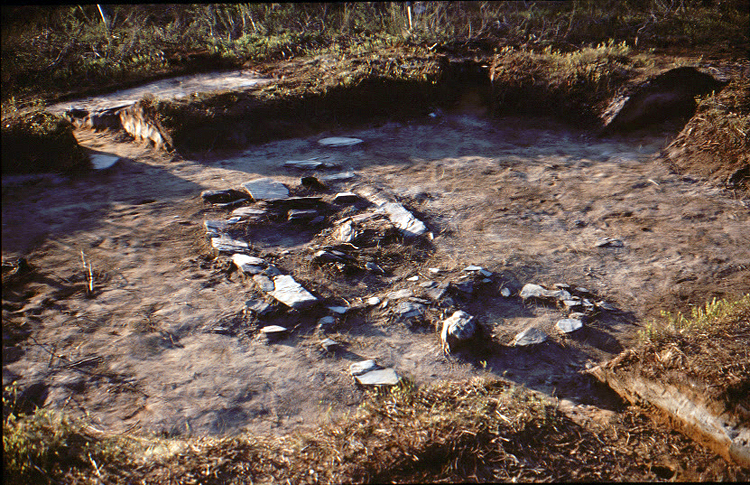
A stallo building under excavation at Mavas, Arjeplog, Sweden

On account of the identification of relics of ancient buildings with the 'stallo' in the southern part of the Sámi area of Sweden, archaeologists have come to refer to such relics as 'Stallo sites,' following the lead of Ernst Manker's 1960 study Fångstgropar och stalotomter ('hunting pits and stallo sites'). Such buildings are actually round or oval, with a diameter of four to six metres, arranged linearly in groups of two to eight (or, more rarely, more, up to fifteen). Around sixty such sites are known, distributed along what is now the Norway-Sweden border, from Frostviken in Jämtland county to the south, to Devddesvuopmi in Troms to the north. They are found above the tree line, at heights between 550 and 850 metres. They seem to have been in most extensive use around 800–1050 CE, that is, during the Viking Age. Scholars agree that these were temporary dwellings, probably for use in the warmer months, and that they reflect a change in the economic habits of their users, almost certainly associated with hunting or herding reindeer. Nevertheless, there is extensive debate over whether the inhabitants were ethnically Norse or Sámi, where their permanent habitations were located, and their purpose. As of 2014, debate was ongoing, but opinion at that time favoured the idea that the stallo sites were used by Sámi people, partly because the layout of the buildings corresponds to later Sámi dwellings.

== In folklore ==
Stallo appears in Sámi folktales, such as How the Stalos were Tricked, Stalo och Kauras, and The Tale of Njunje Paggas.

== See also ==
- Jötunn
- Troll
- Giant
- Bergsrå
- Oread
- Sámi shamanism
- John Bauer
- Ogre
- Oni
