= Steven Bennet =

17th century Explorer and whaler

Steven (or Stephen) Bennet was an early 17th-century explorer, sealer, and whaler.

== Life ==
In 1603 he was master of the 50-ton ship Grace, sent by Sir Francis Cherry on a trading and exploratory voyage. After sailing to the Kola River in Russia, they went to the northwest, intending to make "some further discoveries". On 16 August (OS) they sighted Bear Island—the first English expedition to do so. They spent the next day exploring the coast, but returned aboard ship "without any profit". The expedition returned to London on 10 September.

The following year, 1604, Bennet was sent as master of the 60-ton ship Godspeed on a trading and sealing expedition, with Thomas Welden as merchant. They left London in mid-April and spent the following two months in Norway and Russia. They came to Bear Island early in July. They stayed on the island until 13 July, taking over a hundred walrus with fowling pieces and muskets. They spent the latter half of July and part of August at "Pechingo in Lapland" and Kola, returning to the Thames on 15 October. On their return to London, they renamed Bear Island Cherry Island in honor of Sir Francis Cherry, who "was at the charges of this Discoverie".

In 1605 Bennet was again sent as master of a 60-ton ship on a voyage to Cherry Island, with Welden as merchant. They left London on 1 May but were captured by a Dunkirk ship on the 23rd, which "tooke from us two Hogsheads of strong Beere, our Muskets, a Fowling Peece of Master Weldens, which cost three pounds sterling." They arrived at Cherry Island on 2 July and four days later began hunting walrus, now killing them with both "shot and javelings". They obtained eleven tuns of oil, as well as taking their tusks. The expedition returned to London on 24 August.

In 1606 Bennet was again master of the same 60-ton ship on a sealing expedition to Cherry Island, with Welden again as merchant. In 1611 he served as master of the 150-ton ship Mary Margaret, which was sent to Spitsbergen on a whaling expedition. Due to Bennet's negligence, the Mary Margaret was driven ashore by ice in or near Engelskbukta. The men were forced to row and sail to Bear Island, where they found Jonas Poole, master of the Elizabeth (which was sent to accompany the Mary Margaret).
