= Mavas =

- Location within Azerbaijan
- Coordinates: 39°42′46″N 46°56′05″E
- Country: Azerbaijan
- District: Khojavend
- Time zone: UTC+4 (AZT)

Mavas (Armenian: Մավաս; also, Movas) is a village in the Khojavend District of Azerbaijan.
