= Hornsund =

Fjord in Norway

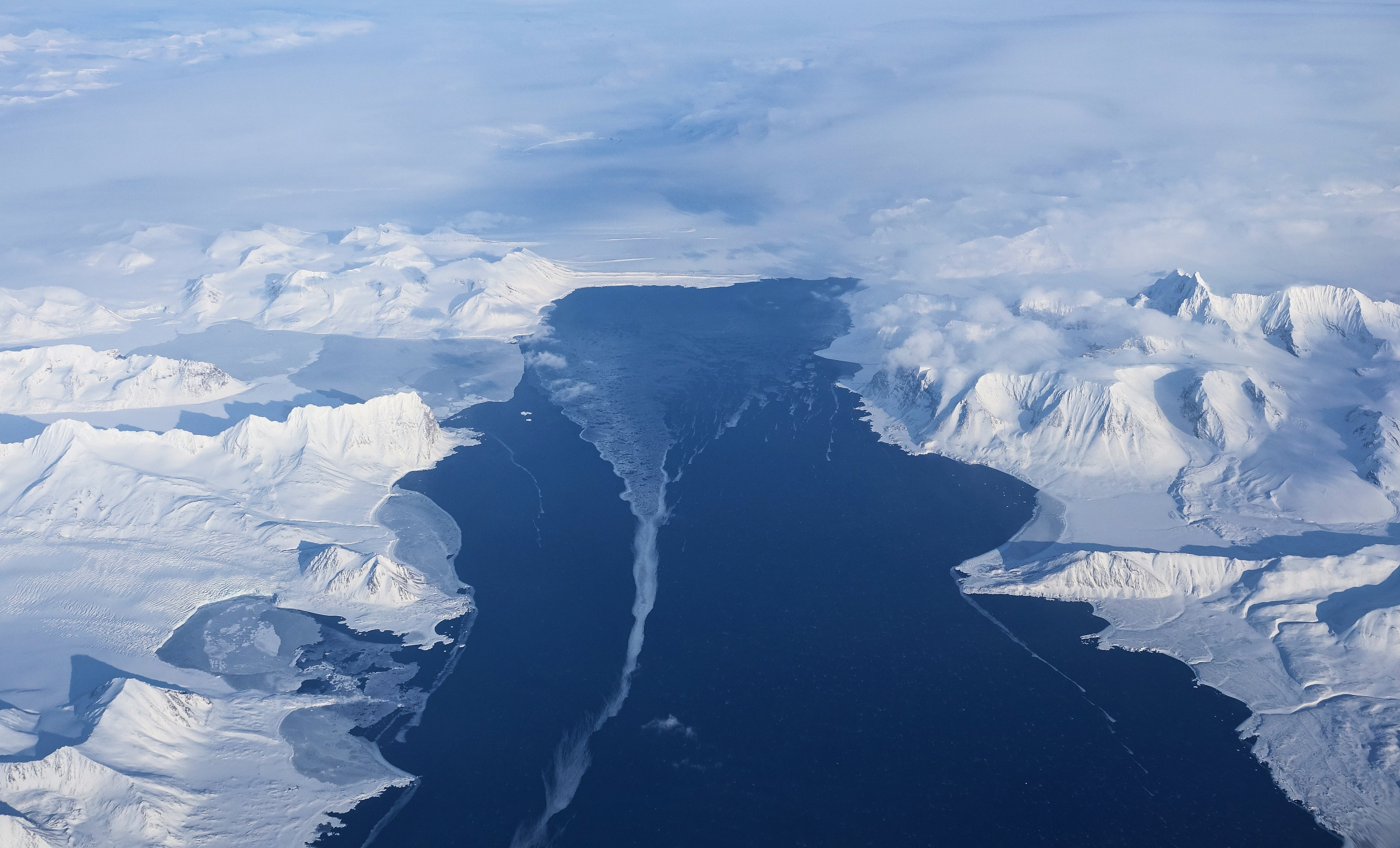
- Hornsund west to east
- Interactive map of Hornsund
- Location: Svalbard, Norway
- Coordinates: 76°59′N 15°55′E
- Max. length: 35 km (22 mi)

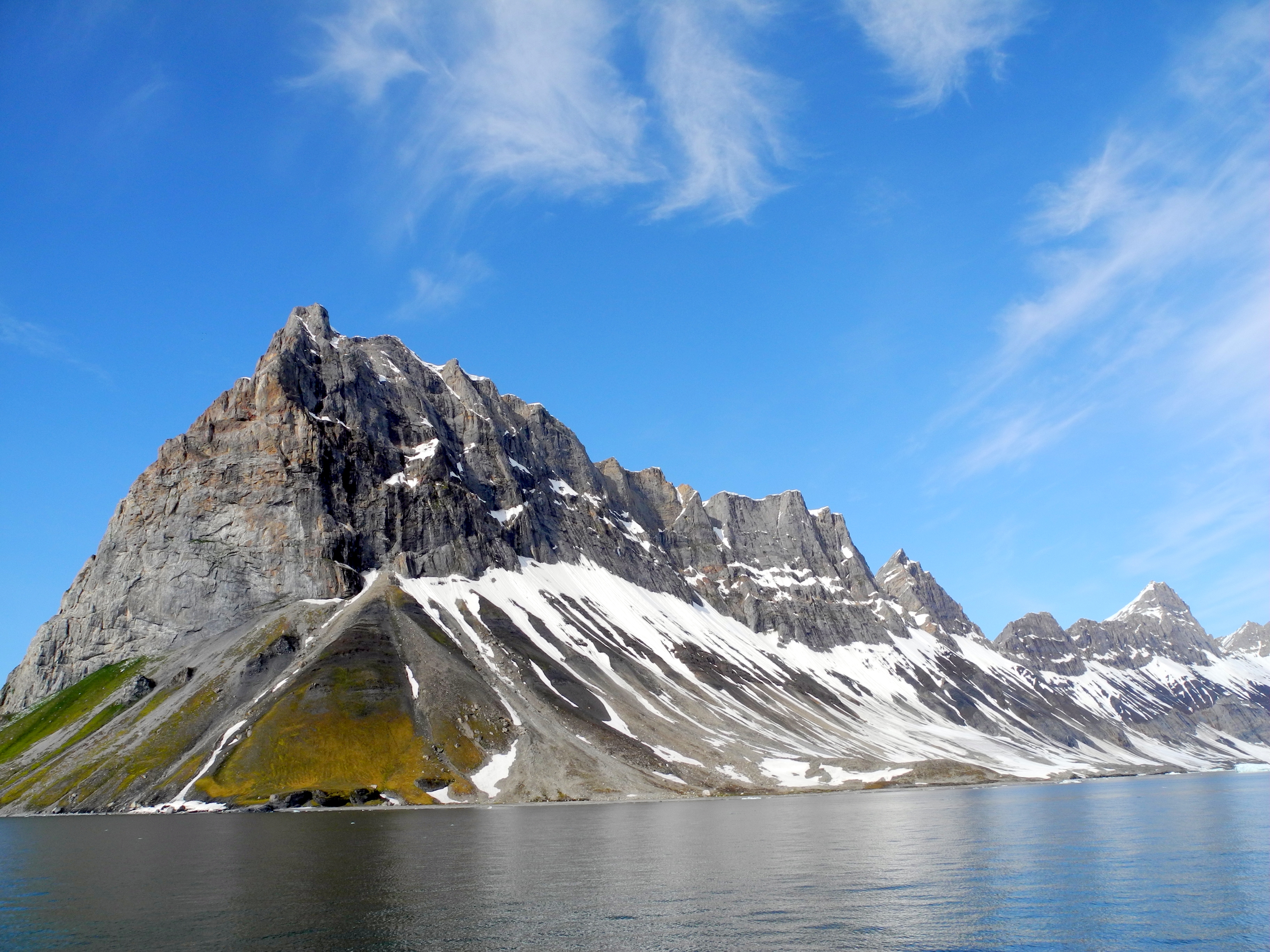
Burgerbukta, a bay in the north of Hornsund

Hornsund is a fjord on the western side of the southernmost tip of northern Norway's Spitsbergen island.

The fjord's mouth faces west to the Greenland Sea, and is 12 kilometres (7.5 mi) wide. The length is 30 kilometres (19 mi), the mean depth is 90 metres (300 ft), and the maximal depth is 260 metres (850 ft). Hornsund cuts different geological formations, from the Precambrian to the west to the upper Mesozoic to the east, and it is perpendicular to the main regional fractures of Spitsbergen.

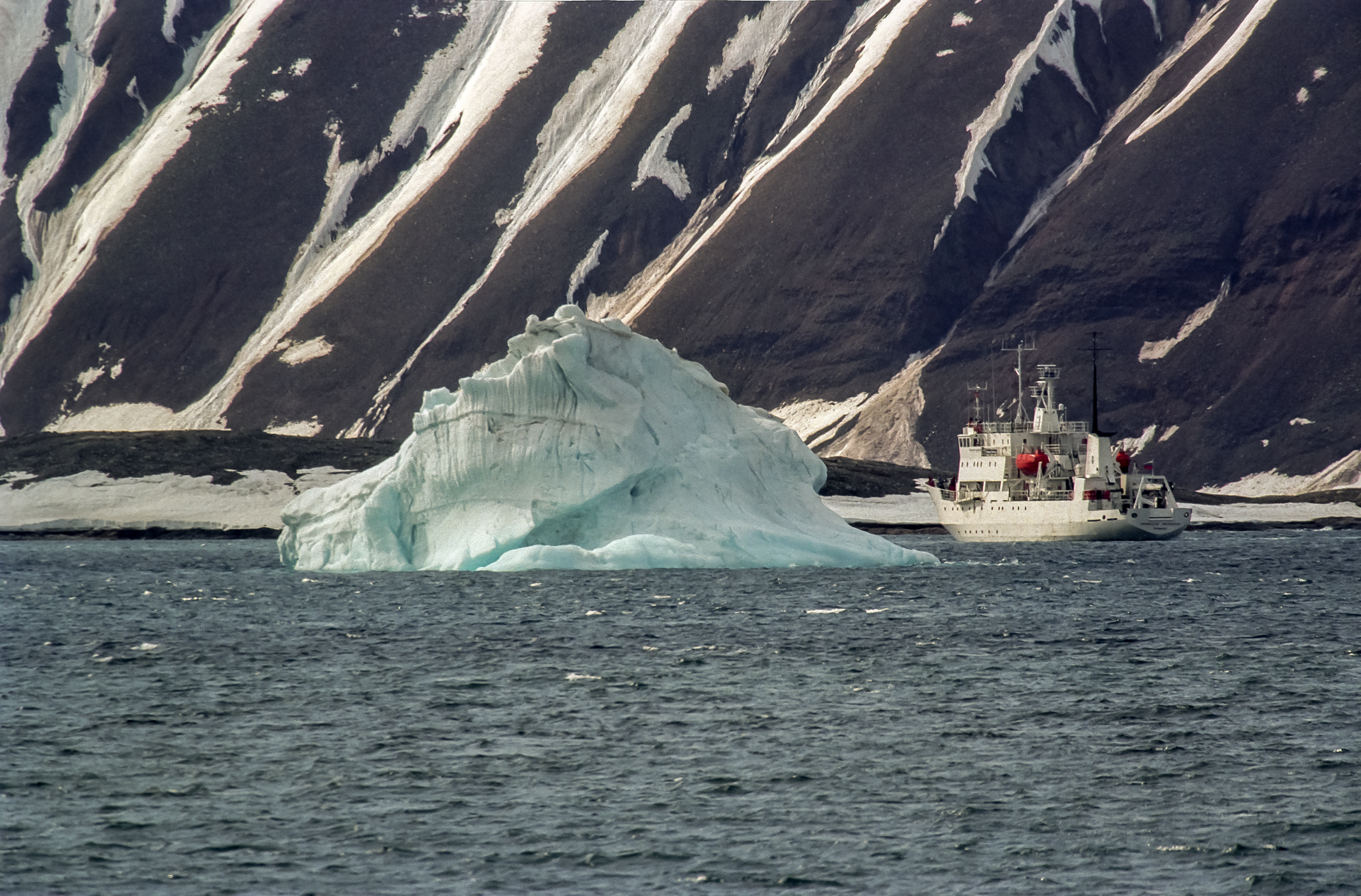
a Russian vessel at Hornsund

The coastline of Hornsund is diversified, with a number of bays at the mouths of mountainous glacial valleys. Some of these bays have appeared as late as the beginning of the last century due to recession of glaciers.

A Polish research station has been operating there since 1957.

== History ==
The English explorer Jonas Poole visited Hornsund in 1610, giving the fjord its name after his men had brought back a reindeer antler. In 1613 the first whaling ships used Hornsund, the majority of which were driven away by the English. In 1614 the fjord was ceded to the Dutch, but only for this season. In 1617 and 1618 Dutch ships again used Hornsund, but were either driven away or had their goods stolen. Danish ships also resorted to the fjord in 1617, and were forced to give a fifth of their catch to the English. The English held a near monopoly on whaling in the bay until they abandoned it in the late 1650s. In 1634 there was a dispute between the London and Yarmouth ships there, resulting in the death of one man.
