= Engelskbukta =

Bay in Svalbard, Norway

Coordinates: 78°50′N 11°50′E

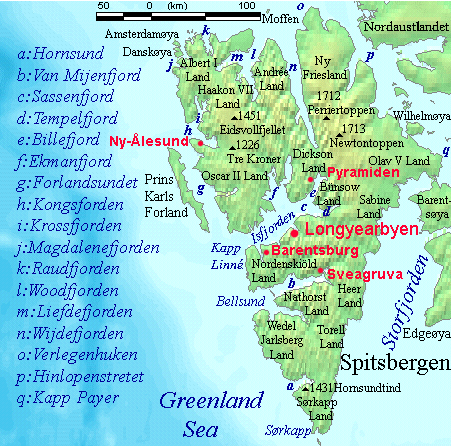
Engelskbukta is the small bay on the northeastern shore of Forlandsundet, just below Ny Alesund.

Engelskbukta (English: English Bay) is a 1.5 km wide bay on the eastern side of the northern reaches of Forlandsundet, the sound that separates Prins Karls Forland and Spitsbergen. It derives its name from the fact that English whalers resorted to the bay in the first half of the 17th century. Here they first established a temporary whaling station in 1611, and later (perhaps as early as 1613) established a semi-permanent one. In or near this bay two English ships, the 150-ton ship Mary Margaret, and the 60-ton bark Elizabeth, were wrecked in 1611. This event led the English to call the bay Cove Comfortless for the next five decades.
