= Forlandsundet =

Coordinates: 78°35′N 11°44′E

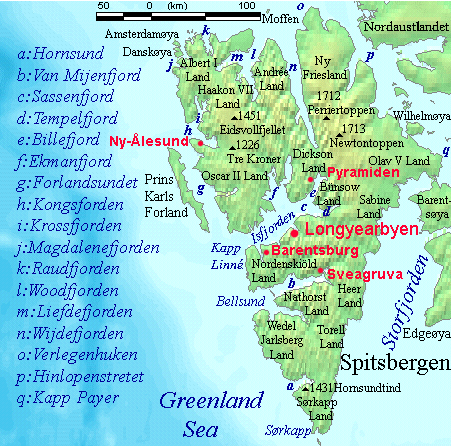
Forlandsundet (labelled g) is on Spitsbergen's west coast

Forlandsundet is an 88 km long sound separating Prins Karls Forland and Spitsbergen. Its northern limits are Fuglehuken to the west and Kvadehuken to the east. Its southern limits are Salpynten to the west and Daudmannsodden to the east.
