= Eidembreen =

Glacier in Svalbard, Norway

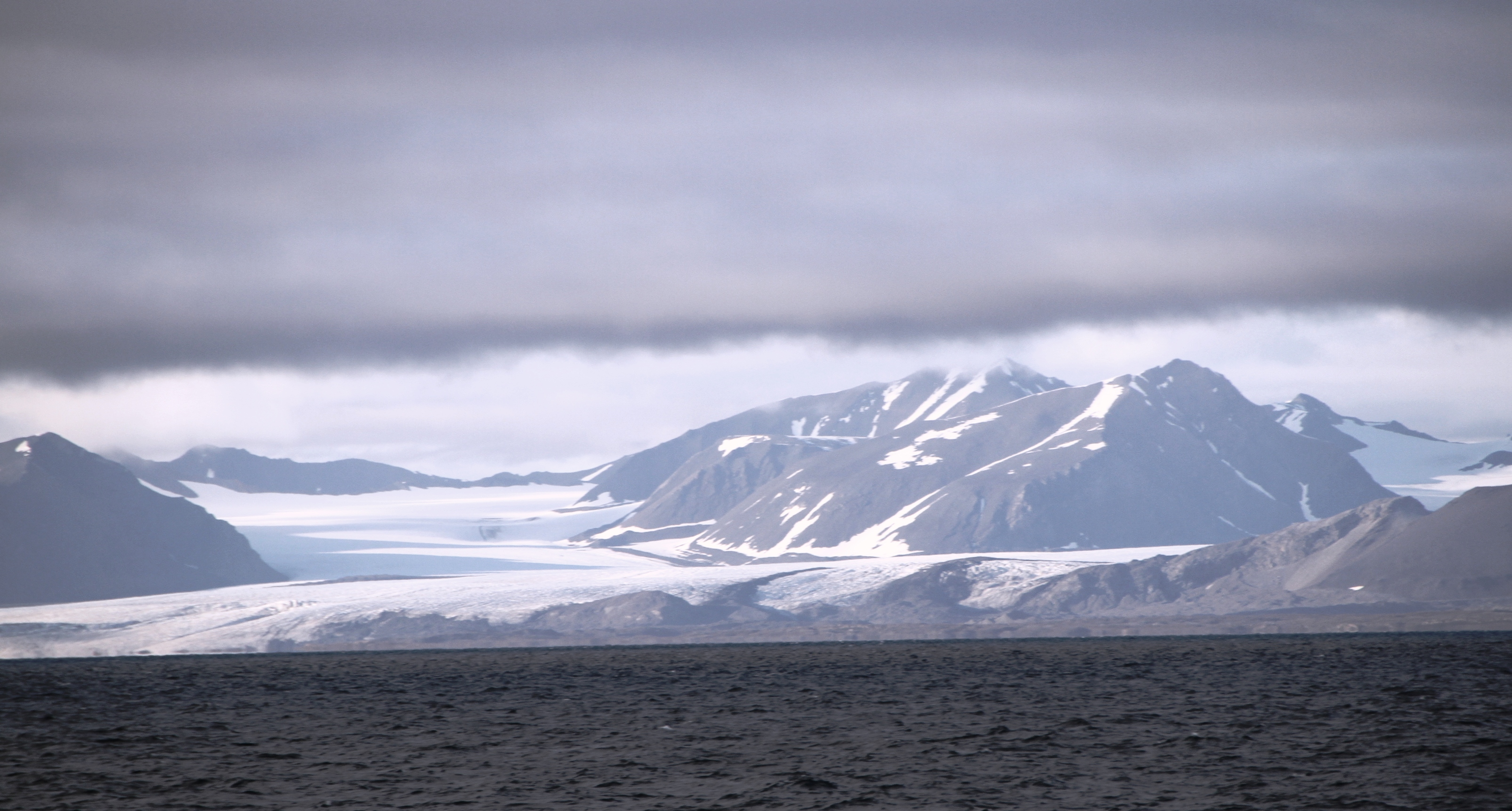
- View from the southernmost coast of Oscar II Land

- Location within Svalbard
- Location: Oscar II Land, Spitsbergen, Svalbard
- Coordinates: 78.40°N 13.16°E
- Length: About 18 kilometres (11 mi)

Eidembreen is a glacier in Oscar II Land at Spitsbergen, Svalbard. It has a length of about eighteen kilometers, and debouches into Eidembukta in Forlandsundet, between St. Jonsfjorden and Isfjorden. The glacier is named after Norwegian politician and naval officer Ole Thorenius Eidem. Eidembreen belongs to the mountain and glacier complex of Trollheimen. Further north are Austgötabreen and Huldrebreen, and to the south are Stallobreen and Heksebreen.
