= Oscar II Land =

Land area between Isfjorden and Kongsfjorden on Spitsbergen, Svalbard

Coordinates: 78°40′N 13°30′E

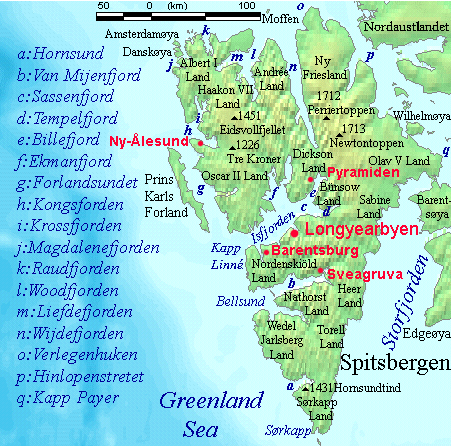
Oscar II Land is located on the western side of Spitsbergen, between Isfjorden and Kongsfjorden.

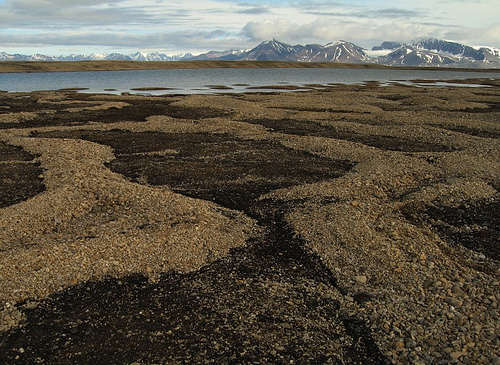
Eskers from Oscar II Land. In the background is Prince Charles Foreland.

Oscar II Land is the land area between Isfjorden and Kongsfjorden on Spitsbergen, Svalbard. The 30 km (19 mi) long glacier Sveabreen divides Oscar II Land from James I Land.

The area is named after Oscar II of Sweden. Older name variants are Oscar II's Land and Terre Oscar II.

The Hofgaardtoppen mountain is the highest peak in Oscar II Land.
