= Goldschmidtfjella =

Mountain in Svalbard, Norway

Coordinates: 78.6466°N 13.2179°E

Goldschmidtfjella is a mountain in Oscar II Land at Spitsbergen, Svalbard. It forms a 6 kilometer long nunatak in the glacier Osbornebreen, north of the head of St. Jonsfjorden, and reaches an altitude of 581 meters. The mountain is named after geologist and mineralogist Victor Moritz Goldschmidt. Nearby mountains are Carlsfjella to the west and Devikfjellet to the east.
