= Haraldfjellet =

Mountain in Svalbard, Norway

Coordinates: 78.6670°N 12.9554°E

Haraldfjellet is a mountain in Oscar II Land at Spitsbergen, Svalbard. It is located in the northern part of Carlsfjella and has a height of 849 m.a.s.l. It forms a nunatak surrounded by the three glaciers Konowbreen, Løvenskioldfonna and Osbornebreen. The mountain is named after Norwegian landowner Harald Løvenskiold.
