= Jørgenfjellet =

Mountain in Svalbard

Coordinates: 78.426°N 12.659°E

Jørgenfjellet is a mountain in Oscar II Land at Spitsbergen, Svalbard. It reaches a height of 681 m.a.s.l. and is located at the southern side of the mountain area of Svartfjella. The mountain is named after Norwegian naval officer and hydrographic surveyor Jørgen Petersen-Hansen. It was ascended during an expedition in 1909, for geographical surveying. Between Jørgenfjellet and Holmesletfjella is the glacier of Hydrografbreen.
