= Devikbreen =

Glacier in Svalbard

Coordinates: 78.6302°N 13.4664°E

Devikbreen is a glacier in Oscar II Land at Spitsbergen, Svalbard. It is located between Devikfjellet and Krymlefjellet to the north/west, and Tispa, Kvelpane and Klampen to the south/east. Devikbreen merges with several other glaciers, including Osbornebreen, Klampebreen, and Vintervegen, and the merged glacier debouches into St. Jonsfjorden. The length of the glacier is six kilometers. The glacier is named after physicist Olaf Devik.
