= Devikfjellet =

Mountain in Spitsbergen, Norway

Coordinates: 78.6387°N 13.3749°E

Devikfjellet is a mountain in Oscar II Land at Spitsbergen, Svalbard. It is located between the glaciers Osbornebreen and Devikbreen, northeast of the head of St. Jonsfjorden, and has an altitude of 860 meters. The mountain is named after physicist Olaf Devik. Nearby mountains are Krymlefjellet to the north and Klampen to the south.
