= Bakke Church =

Bakke Church may refer to:

- Bakke Church (Agder), a church in Flekkefjord municipality in Agder county, Norway
- Bakke Church (Trondheim), a church in Trondheim municipality in Trøndelag county, Norway
- Bakke Church (Buskerud), a church in Øvre Eiker municipality in Buskerud county, Norway
