= Ole Andreas Krogness =

Ole Andreas Krogness may refer to:

- Ole Andreas Krogness (physicist)
- Ole Andreas Krogness (politician)
