= Krogness =

Krogness is a surname. Notable people with the surname include:

- Johan Richard Krogness (1814–1872), Norwegian businessperson and politician
- Marianne Krogness (born 1951), Norwegian actress, singer and revue artist
- Ole Andreas Krogness (physicist) (1886–1934), Norwegian physicist
- Ole Andreas Krogness (politician) (1802–1869), Norwegian businessperson, merchant and politician
