= Skipperryggen =

Mountain ridge in Svalbard

Coordinates: 78.470°N 12.846°E

Skipperryggen ("The Captain Ridge") is a mountain ridge in Oscar II Land at Spitsbergen, Svalbard. The ridge has a length about four kilometers and is part of the mountain range Holmesletfjella. Skipperryggen is located south of St. Jonsfjorden, between the glaciers of Vestgötabreen and Hydrografbreen. The ridge is named after captain and ship owner Hans Holmeslet.
