= Helgeseter Priory =

Medieval era house of Augustinian Canons in Norway

Coordinates: 63°25′23″N 10°23′17″E

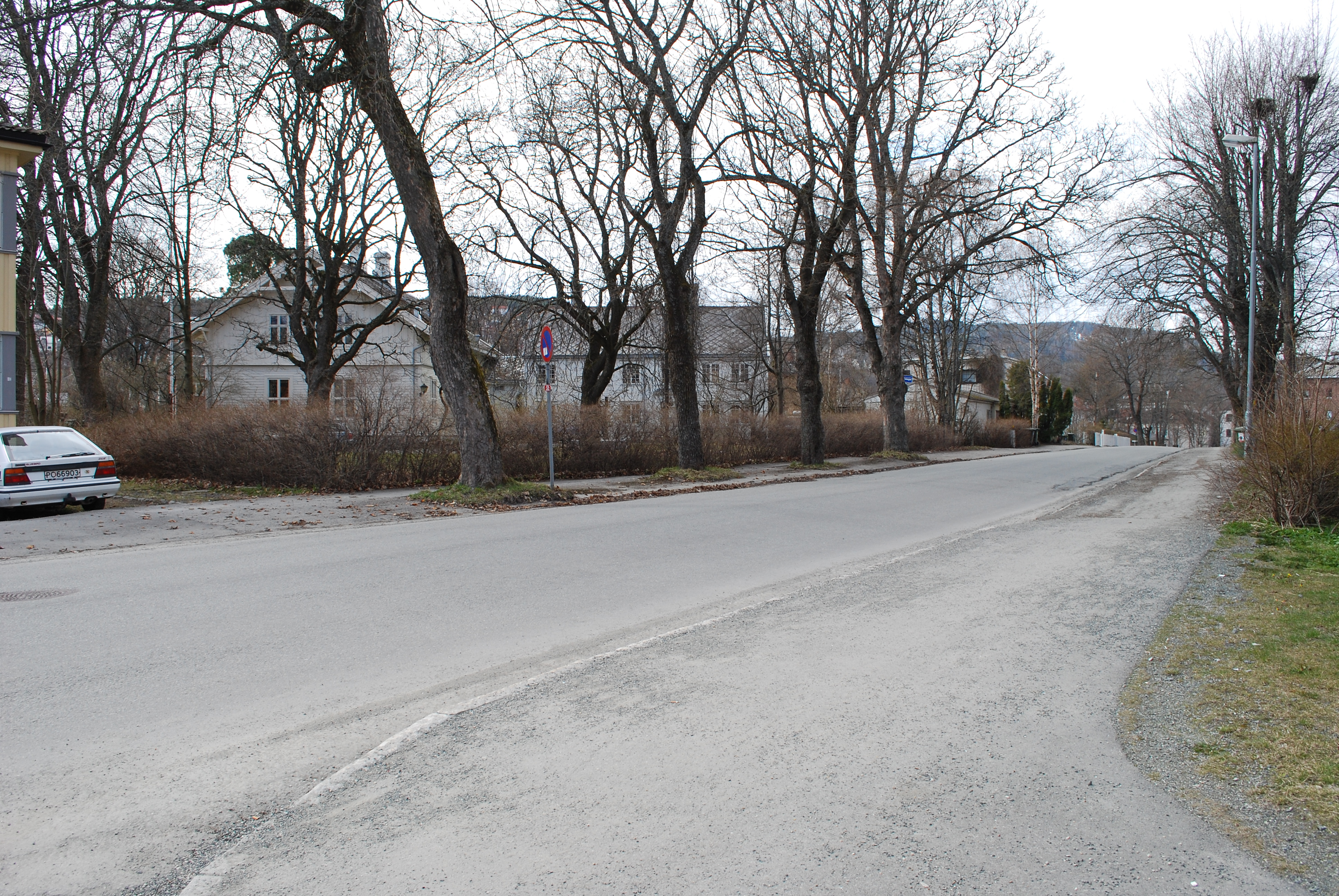
- The site of Helgeseter Priory in 2009
- Interactive map of Helgeseter Priory

Monastery information
- Order: Augustinian Canons
- Established: no later than 1183
- Disestablished: 1537

People
- Founder: Archbishop Eystein

Site
- Location: Elgeseter, Trondheim, Norway
- Visible remains: Ungerground remains only.

Helgeseter Priory or Elgeseter Priory (Elgeseter kloster) was a medieval era house of Augustinian Canons in what is now the neighborhood of Elgeseter in Trondheim, Norway.

== History ==
The monastery was founded by Archbishop Eystein no later than 1183, and rapidly assumed political importance. It was situated across the river Nidelven from Nidaros Cathedral. The priory was connected to the cathedral by Elgeseter Bridge, making it possible for the canons to perform their duty in the cathedral choir. In May 1240, Duke Skule Bårdsson was killed outside this monastery. He had been attacked by the Birkebeiners in Nidaros, and after wandering for a couple of days took refuge in Helgeseter. The Birkebeiners set fire to the monastery and forced Skule out again, whereupon they killed him together with his son Peter.

The priory was suppressed during the Reformation in 1537. The old prior continued to live at the monastery until 1546, when the Lutheran Bishop the Diocese of Nidaros moved in. In 1564 the buildings were burned down. After 1606. the site was used as a quarry for construction on Vår Frue Church and the Archbishop's Palace in Trondheim. There are now no visible ruins, but underground remains lie beneath the present streets Klostergata 47 and 60-62 and the roadway between them, a little south of the Nidelven.

== Burials ==
- Harald Hardrada

== Other sources ==
- Lunde, Øivind (1977) Trondheims fortid i bygrunnen in Riksantikvarens skrifter, nr. 2, pp. 145–148 and 215. (Trondheim : Addresseavisens forl.)
