= Konowryggen =

Mountain ridge in Svalbard, Norway

Coordinates: 78.6030°N 12.8569°E

Konowryggen is a mountain ridge in Oscar II Land at Spitsbergen, Svalbard. The ridge has a length of nine kilometers. On the eastern side is the glacier Konowbreen, and to the west is Gaffelbreen. The ridge is named after Wollert Konow.
