= Vegardbreen =

Coordinates: 78.531°N 13.430°E

Vegardbreen is a glacier in Oscar II Land at Spitsbergen, Svalbard. It has a length of about 5.5 kilometers, runs between Vegardfjella and Vittenburgfjella, and debouches into St. Jonsfjorden. The glacier is named after Norwegian physicist Lars Vegard.
