= Elgeseter =

Neighborhood in the city of Trondheim, Norway

- Neighborhood in Trondheim
- Interactive map of Elgeseter
- Coordinates: 63.4211°N 10.3933°E
- Country: Norway
- Region: Central Norway
- County: Trøndelag
- Municipality: Trondheim Municipality
- Borough: Lerkendal
- Elevation: 15 m (49 ft)
- Time zone: UTC+01:00 (CET)
  - Summer (DST): UTC+02:00 (CEST)

Elgeseter is a neighborhood in the city of Trondheim in Trøndelag county, Norway. It is located in the western part of the borough of Lerkendal in Trondheim Municipality. It is south and east of the river Nidelva, south of the neighborhoods of Midtbyen and Øya, west of Singsaker and north of Nardo. The name comes from Helgeseter, the name of Helgeseter Priory, an Augustinian abbey located at Elgeseter during the Middle Ages.

Elgeseter is the centre of technology in Trondheim, housing both St. Olavs Hospital, the Norwegian University of Science and Technology and parts of Sør-Trøndelag University College. In area is zoned for labour-intensive jobs, resulting in a number of technology companies being at Elgeseter. In addition there is some housing in the area. At the southern end of Elgeseter is the stadium for the Norwegian Premier League team Rosenborg, Lerkendal Stadium. At the north of Elgeseter is Studentersamfundet, the student society house in Trondheim.

The area has always been one of the main transport routes into Trondheim. Already in the Middle Ages there was a bridge over the river, and when the first railway to Trondheim, Trondhjem-Størenbanen was opened in 1863. Since this bridge has been transferred to cars 1884, later to trams 1913 and finally in 1951 the present Elgeseter Bridge was built. The Trondheim Tramway had a separate line, Elgeseterlinjen, between the town centre and Elgeseter between 1913 and 1983, including a depot at the terminus Dalsenget. The main route from the south into Trondheim, European route E6 goes through Elgeseter.
