= Svartfjellstranda =

Lowland in Svalbard, Norway

Coordinates: 78.45°N 12.44°E

Svartfjellstranda ("The Black Mountain Beach") is a lowland in Oscar II Land at Spitsbergen, Svalbard. It is located at the eastern side of Forlandsundet, between the sea and Svartfjella. The area extends about 5.5 kilometers northwards from the brook of Svartfjellbekken.
