= Paulbreen =

Glacier in Svalbard

Coordinates: 78.56°N 13.43°E

Paulbreen is a glacier in Oscar II Land at Spitsbergen, Svalbard. It has a length of about four kilometers and is located at the eastern side of St. Jonsfjorden. The glacier is surrounded by Vittenburgfjella, and splits the range in a northern and southern part. The glacier, as well as the surrounding mountain range, is named after Russian paleontologist Paul Vittenburg.
