= Øya =

Neighborhood in the city of Trondheim, Norway

- Neighborhood in Trondheim
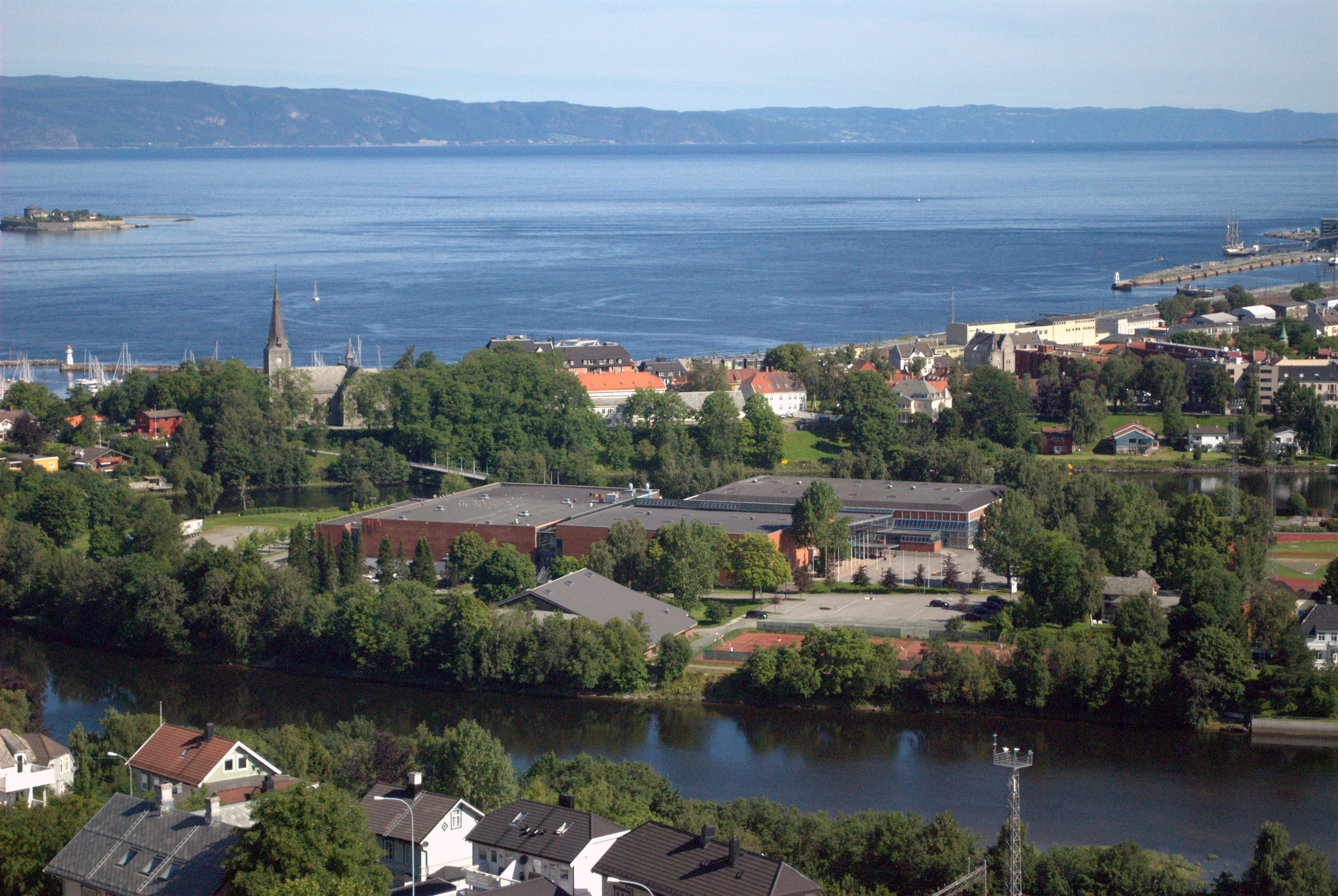
- View of the Trondheim Spektrum sports hall on the Øya peninsula (2012)
- Interactive map of Øya
- Coordinates: 63.4238°N 10.3857°E
- Country: Norway
- Region: Central Norway
- County: Trøndelag
- Municipality: Trondheim Municipality
- Borough: Midtbyen
- Elevation: 8 m (26 ft)
- Time zone: UTC+01:00 (CET)
  - Summer (DST): UTC+02:00 (CEST)

Øya is a neighborhood in the city of Trondheim in Trøndelag county, Norway. It is situated the borough of Midtbyen in Trondheim Municipality, just east of Elgeseter. The neighborhood consists of a peninsula formed by the river Nidelva. The community is located close to the city center and is linked to the Midtbyen neighborhood by the Elgeseter Bridge and foot bridges at Øya stadion and Nidareid. The area is dominated by housing, but also features St. Olavs University Hospital as well as parts of the Norwegian University of Science and Technology and Sør-Trøndelag University College.
