= Valentinryggen =

Coordinates: 78.6009°N 13.0993°E

Valentinryggen is a mountain ridge in Oscar II Land at Spitsbergen, Svalbard. The ridge is located in the southern part of Carlsfjella and has a length of about 4.5 kilometers. Its highest point is 698 m.a.s.l. The ridge is named after Russian scientist Valentin Nikolaevich Sokolov.
