= Krymlefjellet =

Mountain in Svalbard, Norway

Coordinates: 78.674°N 13.420°E

Krymlefjellet (The Bended Mountain) is a mountain in Oscar II Land at Spitsbergen, Svalbard. It has a height of 1,085 m.a.s.l. and is located between the mountains of Bognutane and Devikfjellet. It is separated from Devikfjellet by Devikbreen.
