= Bakke Church (Trondheim) =

Church in Trøndelag, Norway

- Bakke kirke
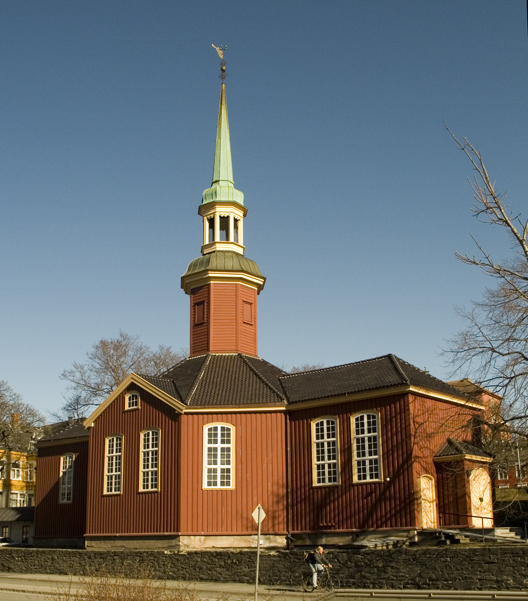
- View of the church
- Bakke Church
- 63.4328198417°N 10.4105021059°E
- Location: Trondheim Municipality, Trøndelag
- Country: Norway
- Denomination: Church of Norway
- Churchmanship: Evangelical Lutheran

History
- Status: Parish church
- Founded: 1715
- Consecrated: 1715

Architecture
- Functional status: Active
- Architect: Johan Christopher Hempel
- Architectural type: Octagonal
- Completed: 1715 (311 years ago)

Specifications
- Capacity: 400
- Materials: Wood

Administration
- Diocese: Nidaros bispedømme
- Deanery: Nidaros domprosti
- Parish: Bakklandet og Lademoen
- Norwegian Cultural Heritage Site
- Type: Church
- Status: Automatically protected
- ID: 83836

Bakke Church (Norwegian: Bakke kirke) is a parish church of the Church of Norway in Trondheim Municipality in Trøndelag county, Norway. It is located in the Bakklandet area of the city of Trondheim, and the church serves the Bakklandet, Møllenberg, Rosenborg, and Nedre Elvehavn areas of Østbyen in Trondheim. It is one of the churches for the Bakklandet og Lademoen parish which is part of the Nidaros domprosti (arch-deanery) in the Diocese of Nidaros. The red, wooden church was built in an octagonal style in 1715 using plans drawn up by the architect Johan Christopher Hempel (died 1729). The church seats about 400 people. It is the oldest building in the Bakklandet area of Trondheim since it was the only building that was spared during the Swedish siege of 1718.

== History ==
After the Trondheim town fire in 1708, the Bakklandet area was placed under the Lade Church parish that was part of the Strinda prestegjeld (later Strinda Municipality). The Bakklandet residents tithed quite a bit and sent a lot of income to the bishop, Peder Krog, who in Bakkelandet and served as a local parish priest. But the other priests of the town protested, and it was claimed that Lade Church was too small a church building for the large size of the congregation, plus the church was some distance away from the Bakke area. So, it was decided to build a new octagonal church in Bakklandet. The bishop originally named the new church after his wife, Anna Dorothea, but it is said that the bishop was the only one who actually used this name. The church in Bakklandet in Trondheim was constructed in 1715. This church was based on the designs of the ten-year-old church at the Trondhjem Hospital which was designed by Johan Christopher Hempel. The Bakke church was built by the carpenters Johan Pedersen Graasten and Johan Henrik Helmers. They used the same plans as the hospital church, but built it to a larger scale. Bakke Church is the oldest building in the Bakklandet area of Trondheim since it was the only building that was spared during the Swedish siege of 1718.

After World War I, the Innherredsveien road (the old European route E6 highway) was widened and upgraded to be a major road through town and the church was located too close to the road. The church had become a major traffic obstruction, forcing cars to go through a narrow stretch along the church. This led to plans to demolish the church, especially after the opening of the new Bakke bridge in 1927. It was decided to save the church so the church was closed in 1938. Site work took place around the building and then the whole church was raised with a jack and moved several meters to the southeast in 1939. It was placed on a new foundation with a lower floor than the original. The entire building was restored and updated at the same time. The process took about three years and it was reopened and re-consecrated in 1941. The move and restoration of the church was led by the architects John Egil Tverdahl and E. Krogseth.

Although the building is owned by the Church of Norway, the state Lutheran church, Bakke Church is also used by Trondheim's small Eastern Orthodox Church congregation, who do not possess their own church building.

== Media gallery ==
Exterior view

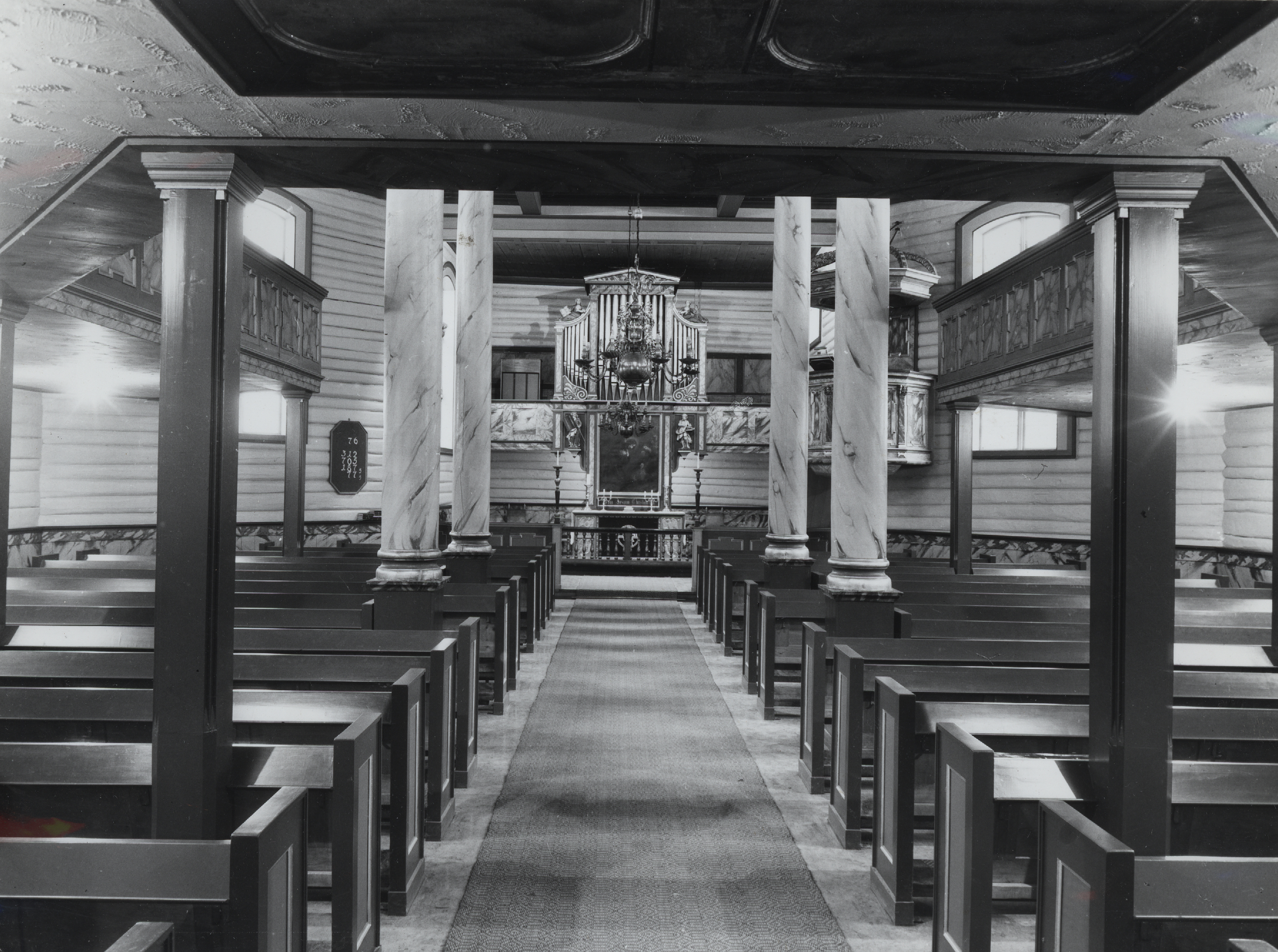
Interior view (1965)

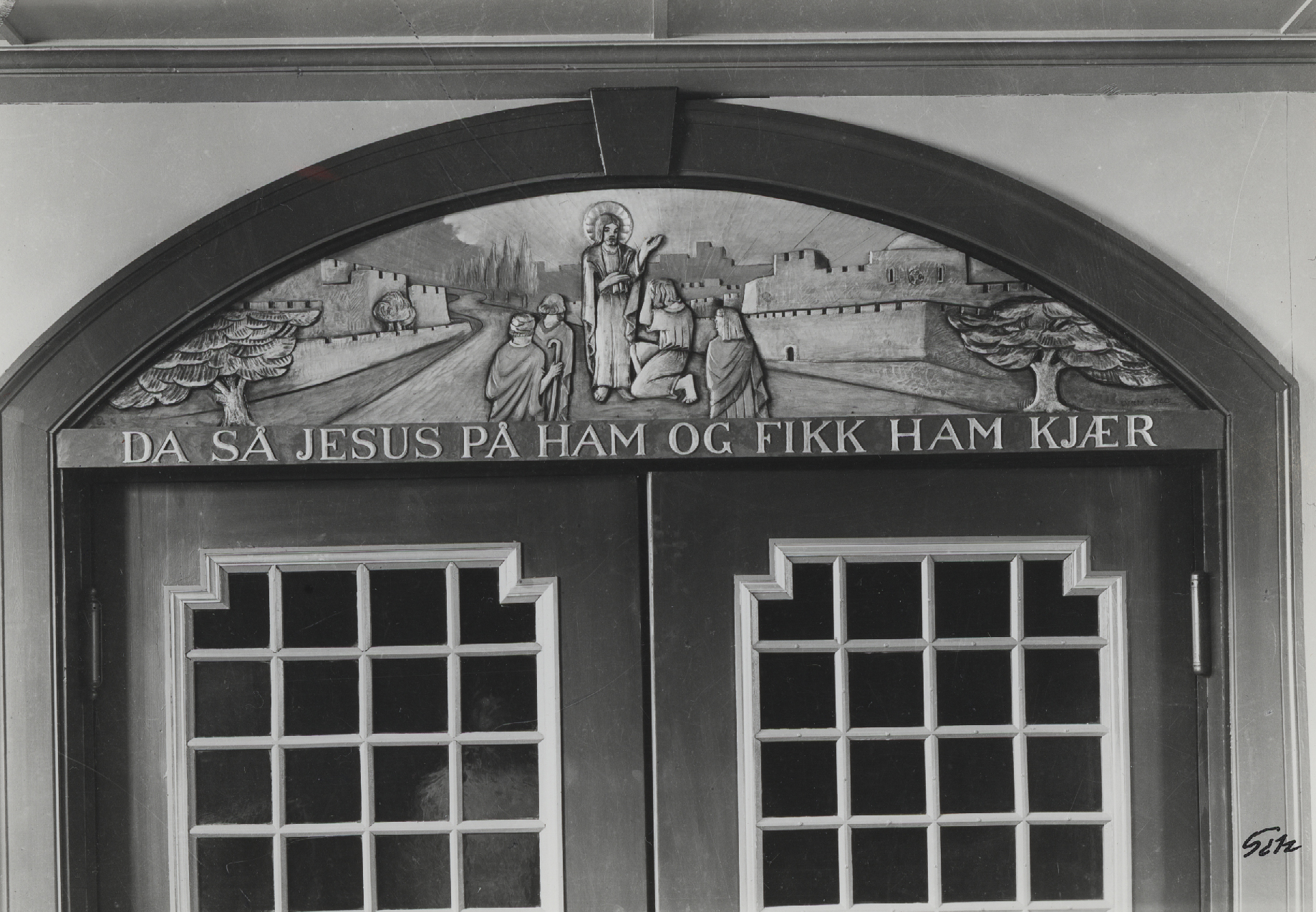

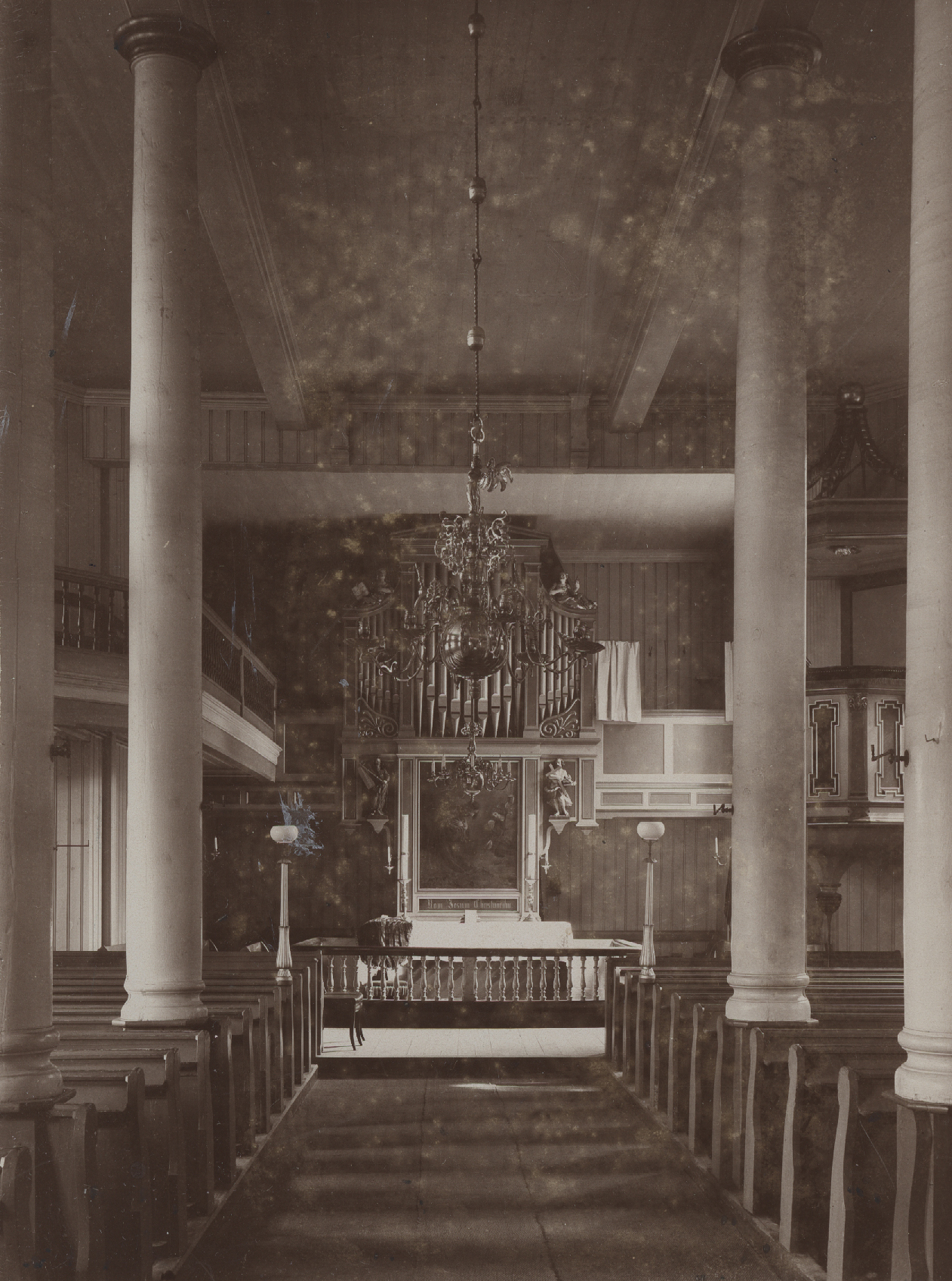
Interior (before 1939)

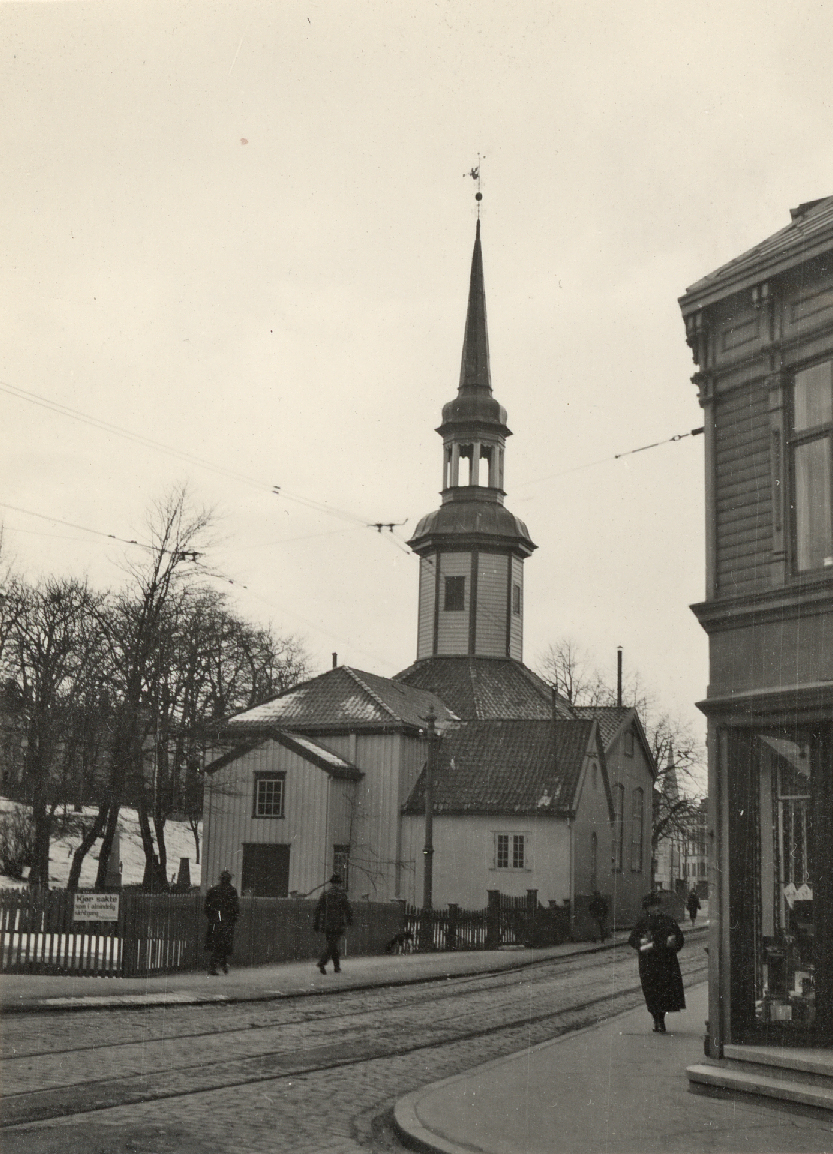
Exterior view (in 1939 before it was moved)

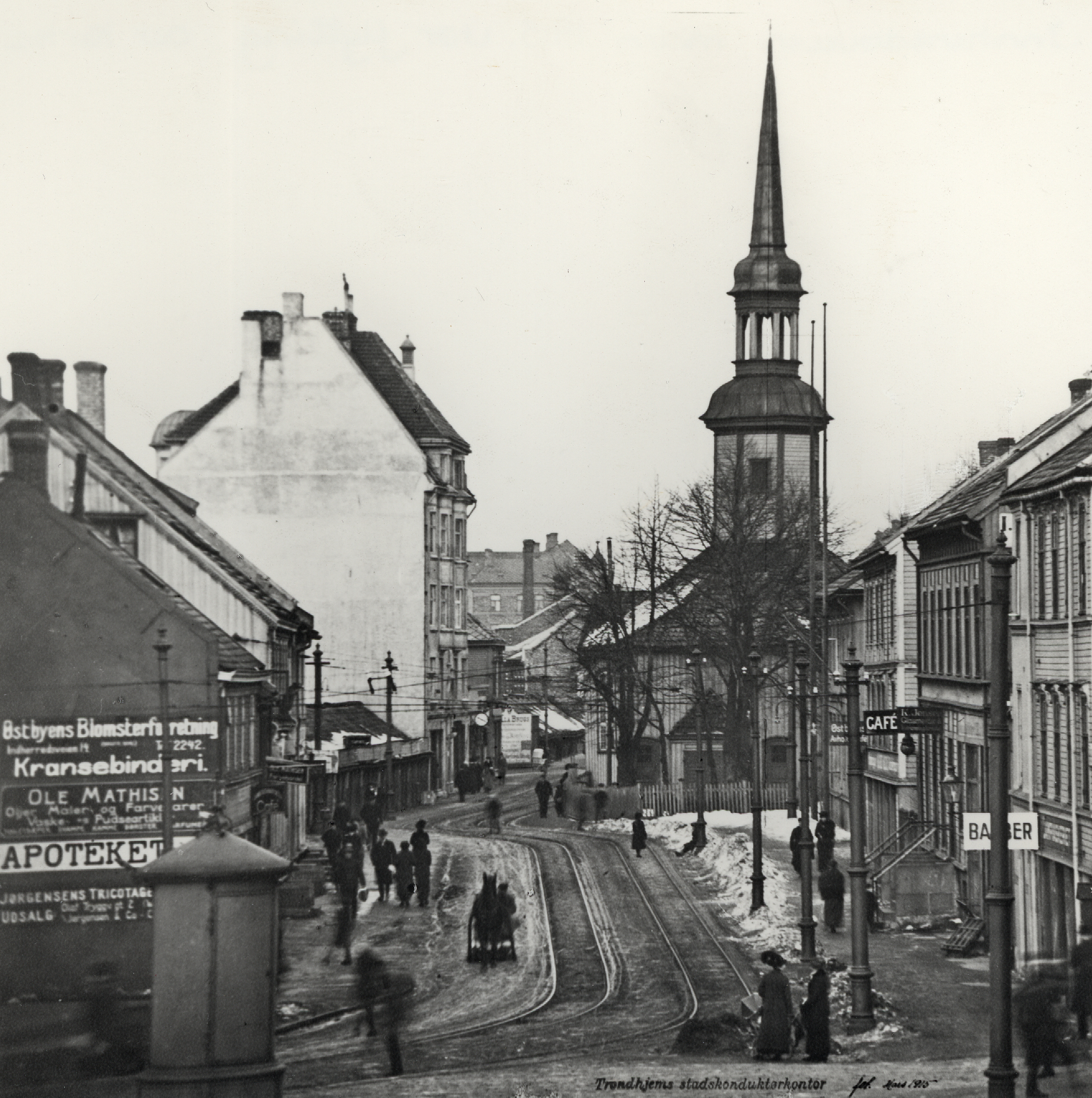
Exterior view (in 1939 before it was moved)

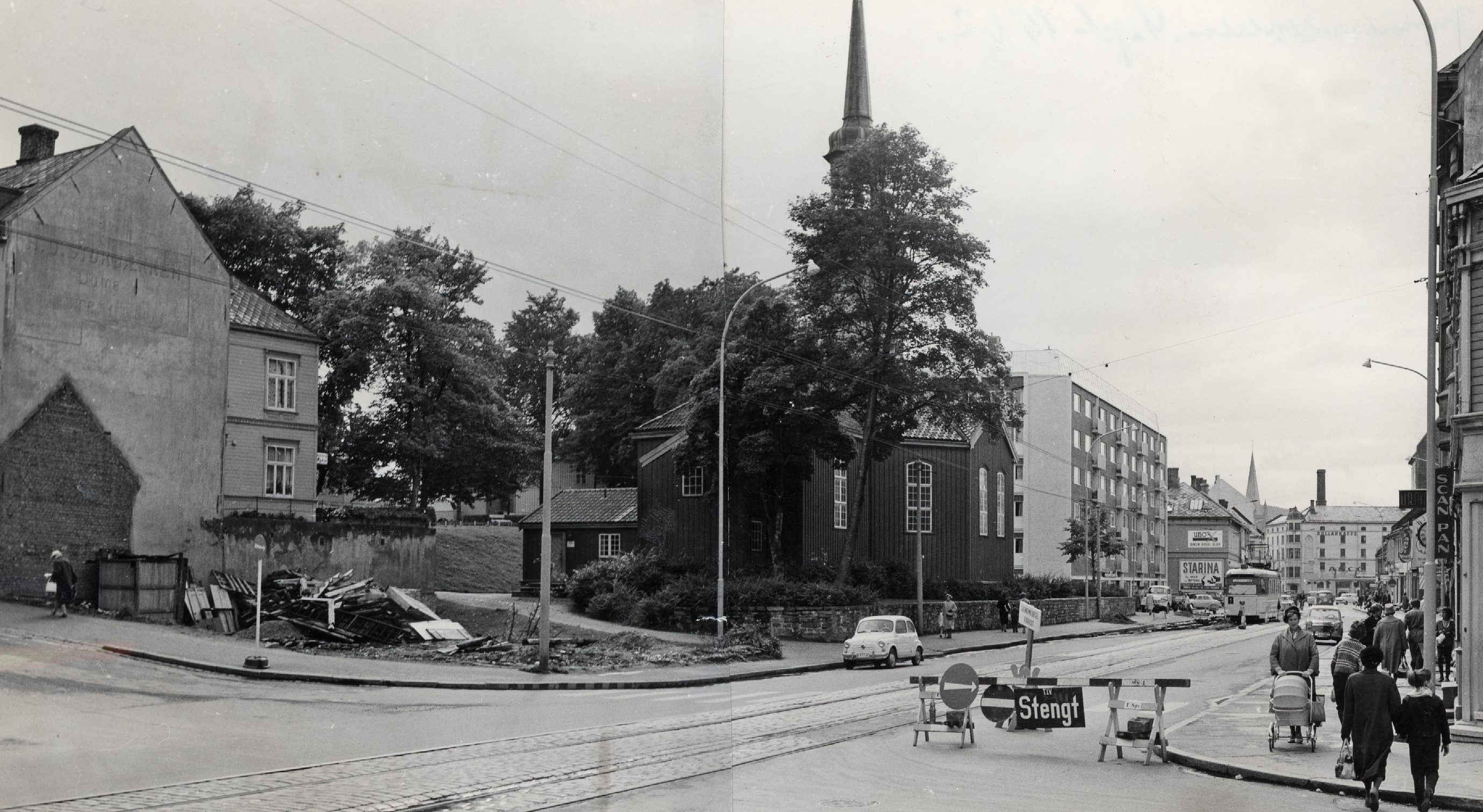
Exterior view (in 1962, after the church was moved in order to widen the road)

== See also ==
- List of churches in Nidaros
