= Patronen =

Mountain in Svalbard

Coordinates: 78.6250°N 12.9887°E

Patronen (The Patron) is a mountain in Oscar II Land at Spitsbergen, Svalbard. It is located in the western central part of Carlsfjella and has a height of 745 m.a.s.l.
