= Old Town Bridge =

Bridge in Trondheim, Norway

Coordinates: 63°25′41.27″N 10°24′6.56″E

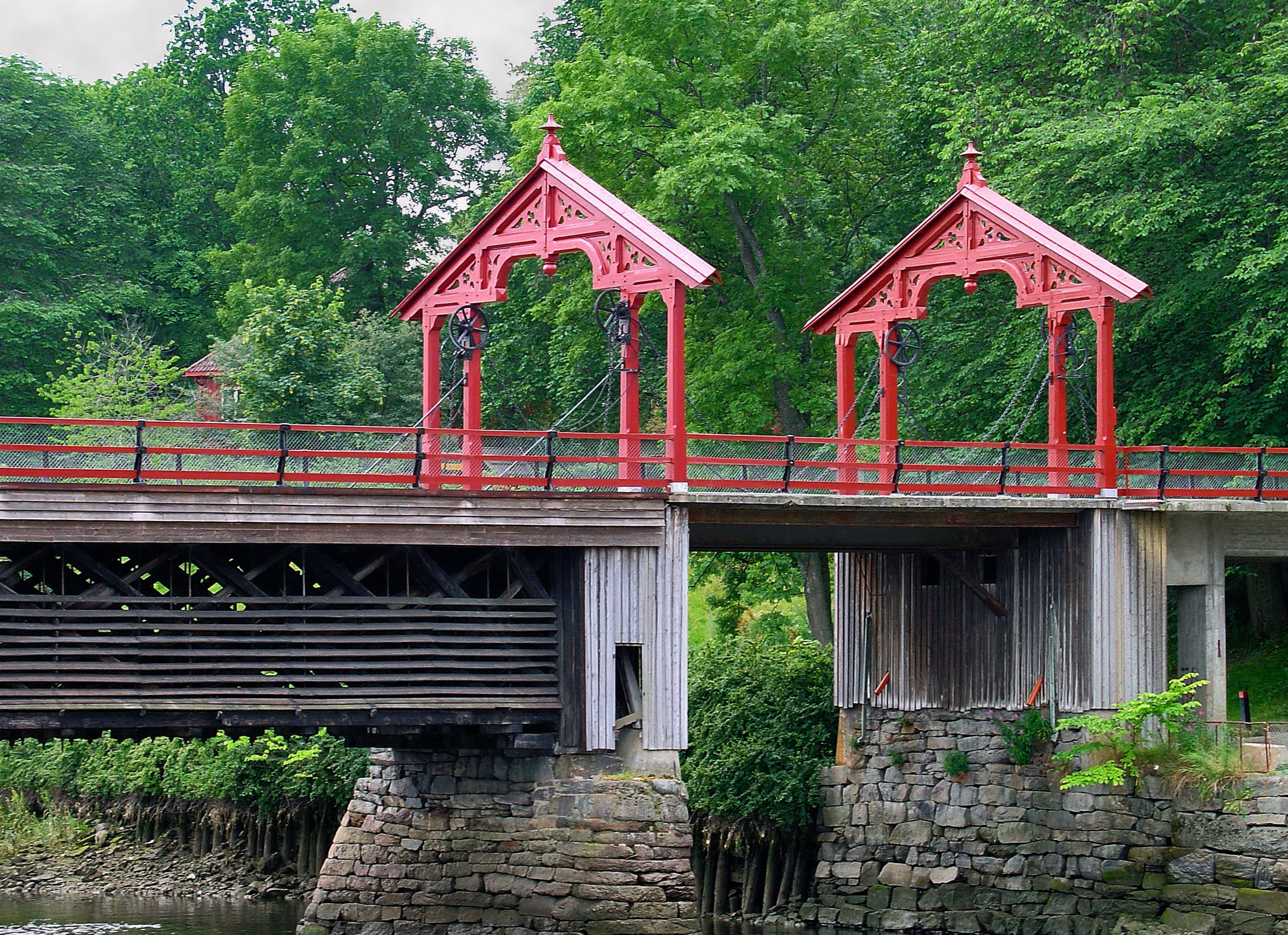
Old Town Bridge with Lykkens portal

Old Town Bridge (Norwegian: Gamle Bybro or Bybroa) is located in Trondheim, Trøndelag County, Norway.

== History ==
Gamle Bybro crosses the Nidelva River from the south end of the main street Kjøpmannsgata connecting to the Trondheim neighborhood of Bakklandet. Gamle Bybro was constructed by Johan Caspar von Cicignon in 1681 in conjunction with the reconstruction of Trondheim after the great fire of 1681. Johan Caspar von Cicignon laid out plans for the reconstruction of Trondheim as well as its fortification. Kristiansten Fortress was built at this time after his plans. The bridge location was of military-strategic significance. King Christian V of Denmark assumed the cost of construction. It was completed in 1685. The bridge was built in the vicinity of the original Elgeseter Bridge. When it was opened the older bridge was allowed to decay and collapse. Since then Gamle Bybro has undergone many changes.

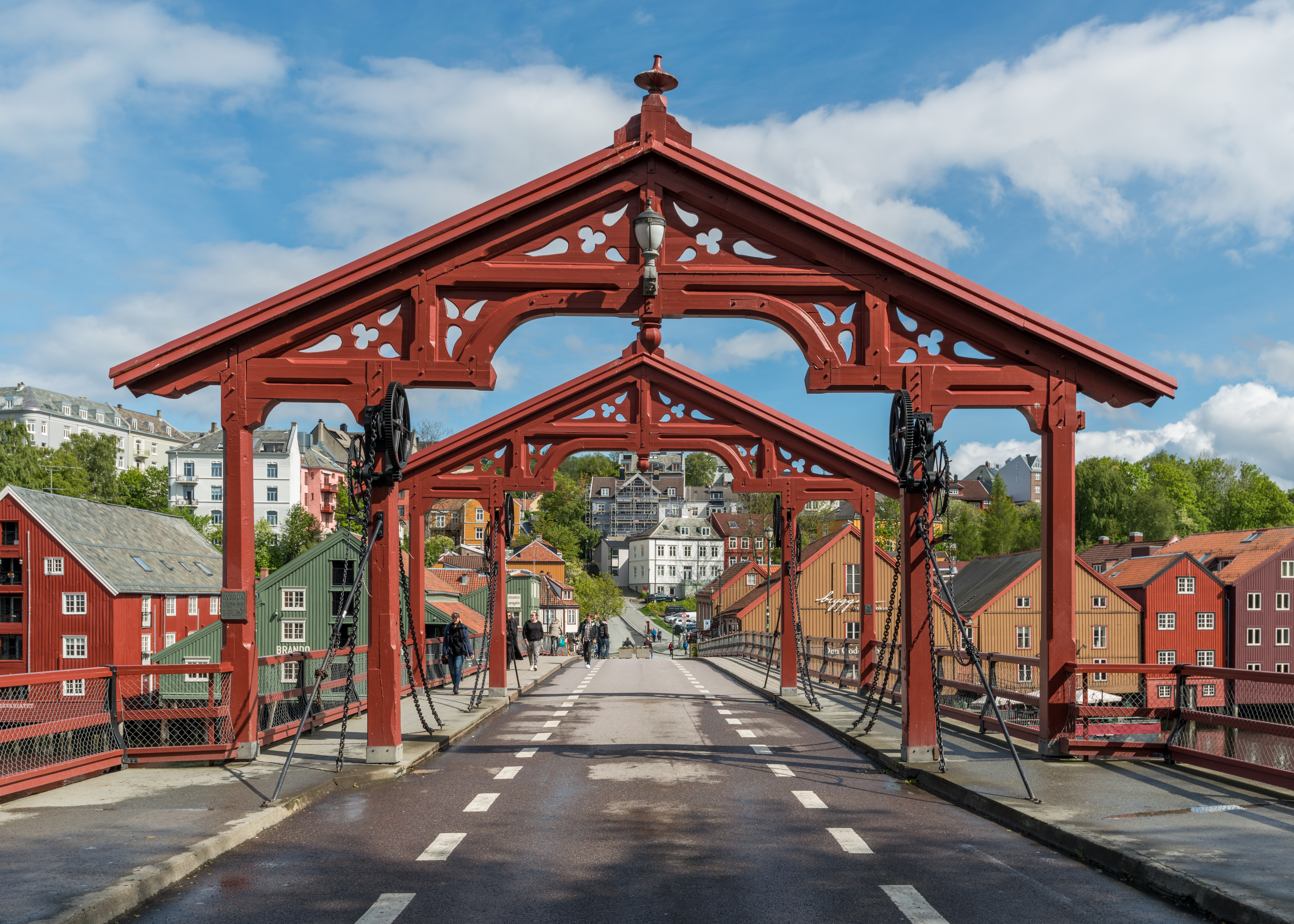
Gamble Bybro (Lykkens Portal)

Originally Gamle Bybro was constructed of wood, but the wood was supported on three stone piers. In the middle of the bridge, an iron gate was placed. This remained a guarded city gate until 1816. At each end of the bridge there was a toll and guardhouse. The access house on the west end still stands, but that on the east side was taken down in 1824. Gamle Bybro was reconstructed in 1861 by the engineer Carl Adolf Dahl (1828-1907). Today Gamle Bybro is one of Trondheim's characteristic landmarks.

Gamle Bybro is also known as Lykkens portal (Gate of Happiness), after the lyrics of the popular waltz Nidelven stille og vakker du er ( "Nidelven quiet and beautiful you are") by Norwegian singer and poet Kristian Oskar Hoddø (1916-1943). According to tradition, Hoddø wrote the poem about the Nidelva River one night in late April 1940 while he was standing at Gamle Bybro. Oskar Hoddø was a member of the resistance movement against the Occupation of Norway by Nazi Germany. He was executed in Trondheim on 17 November 1943 along with eight other Norwegian resistance fighters.

== Other sources ==
- Øksendal, Asbjørn (1969) Lurøy-affæren - Operasjon Oleander : Gestapo i Trondheim og Leksvik-affæren 1942-44 ISBN 978-82-7005-023-9
