= Elgeseter Line =

Tram line in Trondheim, Norway

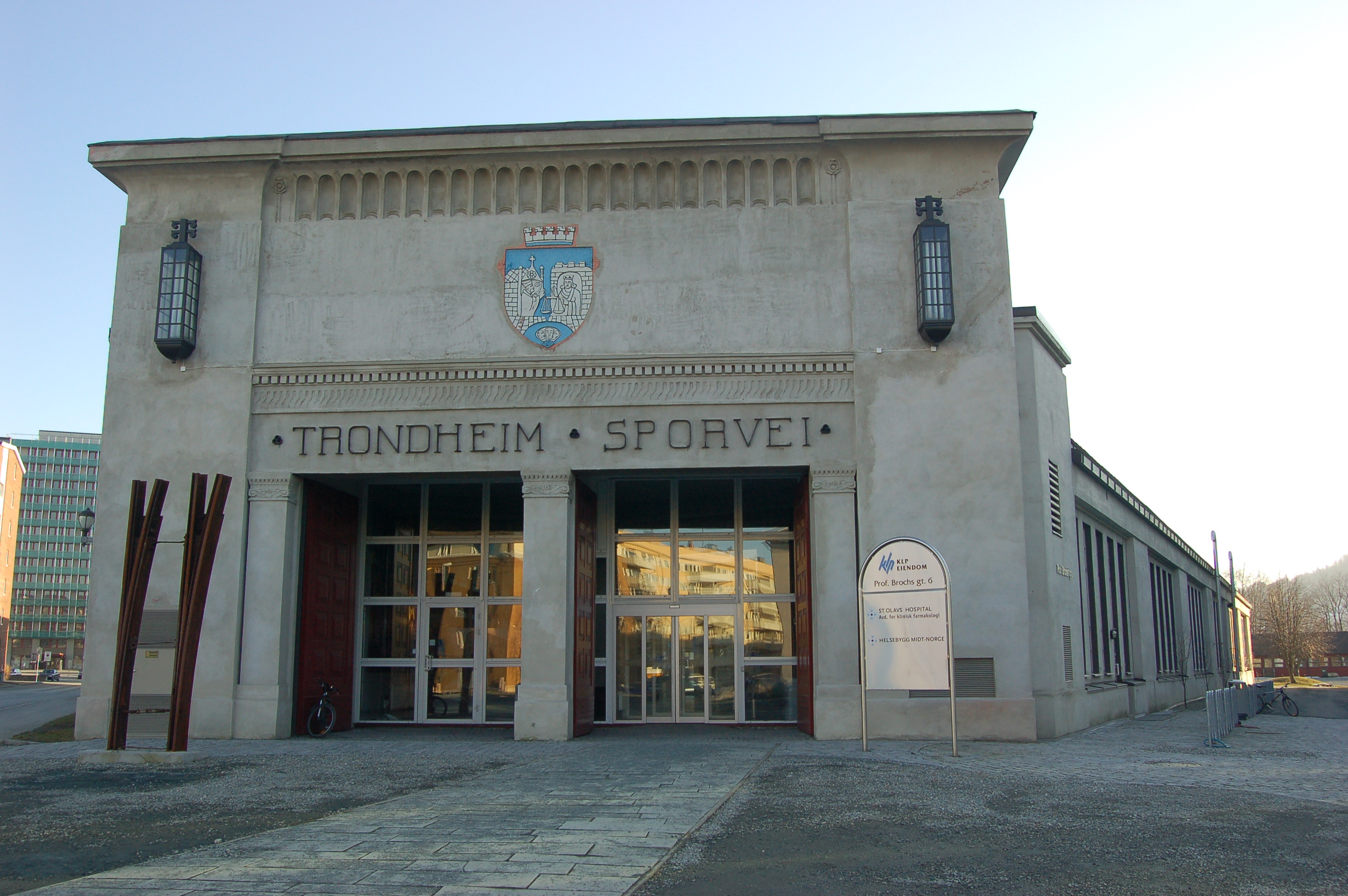
- At the terminus Dalsenget there was a depot

Overview
- Native name: Elgeseterlinjen
- Status: Abandoned
- Owner: City of Trondheim
- Termini: Trondheim Torg; Dalsenget

Service
- Type: Tramway
- System: Trondheim Tramway
- Operator(s): Trondheim Sporvei; Trondheim Trafikkselskap

History
- Opened: 1913
- Closed: 1983

Technical
- Line length: 2.5 km (1.6 mi)
- Track length: 5.0 km (3.1 mi)
- Num of tracks: double
- Track gauge: 1,000 mm (3 ft 3 3/8 in)

The Elgeseter Line (Norwegian: Elgeseterlinjen) was a tramway line in Trondheim Tramway between Trondheim Torg and Elgeseter. The tram line was built in 1913, expanded in 1923 and abandoned in 1983. It was used by Line 2 operated by Trondheim Sporvei, later Trondheim Trafikkselskap, though part of the line was used by Singsaker Line.

== History ==
Trondheim got its first tram in 1893, and by 1913 an expansion was constructed between the city center and Magnus den Godes Street. At the same time a branch line was built to Trondheim Central Station from Olav Tryggvason's Street. The new line went from the station via the city to Elgeseter. In 1923 the line was expanded to Dalsenget and a depot was constructed there.

When the new Lade Line to Lade was built in 1958 Line 2 was moved from the railway station to Lade and in 1974 the operation of the tramway was taken over by the newly created Trondheim Trafikkselskap. But in 1983 a political compromise was made by the city council, with Line 1 extended from Lademoen to Lade (taking over that section of Line 2, to retain service to Lade) and closing the Elgeseter Line, Line 2, and the Lademoen loop. The last day of service was 11 June 1983.
