= Ole Andreas Krogness (politician) =

Norwegian politician (1802–1869)

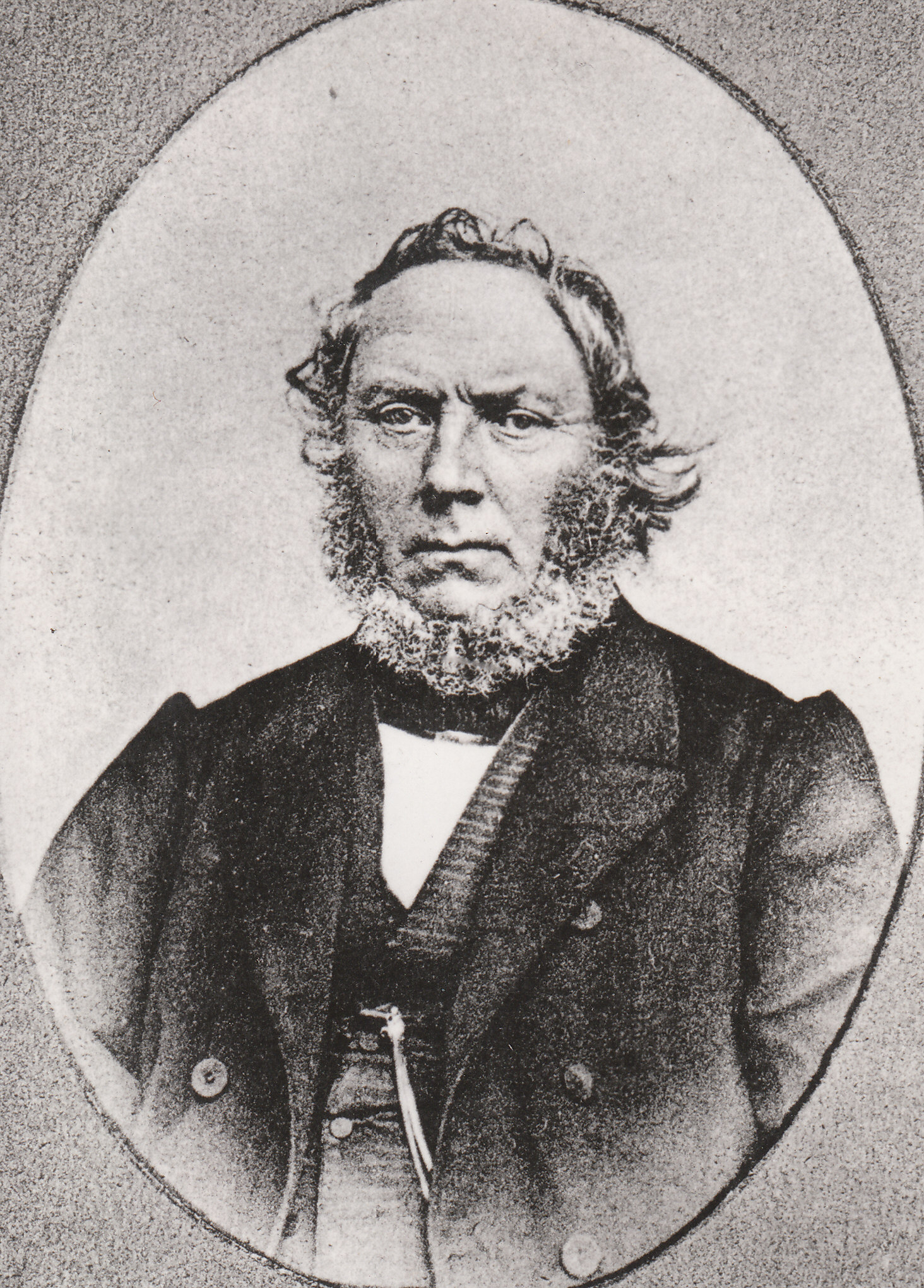
- Born: 21 March 1802; Rissa, Søndre Trondheim, Norway
- Died: 23 July 1869 (aged 67)
- Occupations: merchant and politician
- Known for: co-founder of Trolla Brug
- Notable work: MP Parliament of Norway
- Spouse: Anne Bergithe Dahl
- Parents: Jakob Nielsen Krogness (father); Karen Olsdatter (mother)
- Relatives: Ole Andreas Krogness (grandson)

Ole Andreas Krogness (21 March 1802 – 23 July 1869) was a Norwegian businessperson, merchant and politician.

Krogness was born at Rissa in Søndre Trondheim, Norway. He was a son of Jakob Nielsen Krogness and Karen Olsdatter. He moved to Trondhjem (now Trondheim) in his youth, and started as a merchant's apprentice for the mercantile business of Arent Solem in the neighborhood of Bakklandet. He later married the widow Anne Bergithe Dahl, and took over the company of her former husband Christopher Dahl. Krogness' stepson Odin Chr. Dahl took over around 1850.

Krogness was a board member of Trondhjems Sparebank from 1843 to 1869 and Norges Bank from 1846 to 1869. In 1840, he was a co-founder of Trolla Brug, an enterprise which included a number of grain mills, sheet metal, copper and nail work. He became a member of the city council in the 1840s, and was elected to the Parliament of Norway in 1848, and was re-elected in 1851, 1857 and 1859, representing the constituency of Trondhjem og Levanger (now Nord-Trøndelag and Sør-Trøndelag).

== Personal life ==
Krogness died in July 1869. The street Krogness gate at Øya in Trondheim was named after him. His grandson Ole Andreas Krogness (born 1886) was a notable physicist.
