= Hydrografbreen =

Glacier in Svalbard, Norway

Coordinates: 78.467°N 12.800°E

Hydrografbreen ("The Hydrographer Glacier") is a glacier in Oscar II Land at Spitsbergen, Svalbard. The glacier has a length about eight kilometers, and extends from the mountain range of Holmesletfjella to Jørgenfjellet.
