= Cultura Sparebank =

Norwegian bank

- Company type: Savings bank
- Industry: Banking
- Founded: 1997; 29 years ago
- Headquarters: Oslo, Norway
- Area served: Norway
- Key people: Kjell Fredrik Løvold (CEO)
- Number of employees: 17 (2020)
- Website: www.cultura.no

Cultura Sparebank, branded as Cultura Bank, is a Norwegian savings bank in the ethical banking movement that uses its assets on ethical investments. The bank has offices in Oslo and has total assets of NOK 657 million (2014).

Cultura's roots date back to an initiative from 1982 from a group of Norwegian anthroposophists including Sophus Clausen and economics professor Leif Holbæk-Hanssen, that sought to establish an ethical bank. In 1986, Cultura Lånesamvirke was established, and in 1997, Cultura was granted a full banking license as a savings bank. Cultura is inspired by GLS bank, the leading anthroposophical ethical bank in Germany.

== Mission ==
Cultura Bank's mission is to promote projects with a social and ethical quality. Profitability is secondary, but, of course, economic viability of the projects is a prerequisite for financing.

Cultura Bank offers a range of basic banking products e.g. current accounts with overdraft facilities, loans for new working capital as well as investments loans.

One of the banks projects is the establishment of support accounts where part of the interest rate is transferred to one of the organisations World Wildlife Fund, Regnskogfonded, Save the Children, Norwegian Society for the Conservation of Nature or Kvinne- og Familieforbundet.

== Loans ==
Organic agriculture is one important area and includes manufacturing and distribution of natural food. Another large area is education where the bank finances primary and secondary schools as well as university level institutions. Medicine and healthcare is a third large area in the loan portfolio. Cultural activities like free theatre groups and several artists should also be mentioned. One important goal is to find new ways to finance individual initiatives seen as alternatives to mainstream business and government offerings, projects often turned down by other finance institutions.

Owing to alternative ways of collateralising loans, such as using larger groups of guarantors, many good projects rejected by normal banks have materialised. The bank is also active in the public debate, offering information about alternatives to mainstream economic thought.

== History ==
The bank can trace its roots back to 1986 when Cultura Lånesamvirke was established to promote ethical banking. Through the 1980s and 1990s the bank has merged with a number of domestic lending foundations and funds and was in 1997 made a savings bank.

The bank has issued grunnfondsbevis, but is one of two savings banks in Norway who haven't listed them on Oslo Stock Exchange.
