= Bullbreen =

Glacier in Svalbard, Norway

Coordinates: 78.475°N 12.652°E

Bullbreen is a glacier in Oscar II Land at Spitsbergen, Svalbard. It has a length of about six kilometers, originates from Svartfjella, runs between Holmesletfjella and Bulltinden, and debouches into St. Jonsfjorden. The glacier is named after Norwegian military officer and politician Karl Sigwald Johannes Bull.
