= Vegardfjella =

Coordinates: 78.523°N 13.354°E

Vegardfjella is a mountain in Oscar II Land at Spitsbergen, Svalbard, which is a Norwegian archipelago in the Arctic Ocean. It is located between the glaciers of Vegardbreen and Charlesbreen, and its highest peak is Larstoppen with a height of 859 m.a.s.l. The mountain is named after Norwegian physicist Lars Vegard.
