= Konowbreen =

Glacier in Norway

Coordinates: 78°36′17″N 12°57′05″E

Konowbreen is a glacier in Oscar II Land at Spitsbergen, Svalbard. It is located between Carlsfjella and Konowryggen, and debouches into St. Jonsfjorden. The length of the glacier is 12 kilometers. The glacier is named after Wollert Konow.
