= Vittenburgfjella =

Coordinates: 78.56°N 13.42°E

Vittenburgfjella is a mountain range in Oscar II Land at Spitsbergen, Svalbard. It is located at the eastern side of St. Jonsfjorden, surrounding the glacier of Paulbreen, and its highest peak is 895 m.a.s.l. The mountain range is named after Russian paleontologist Paul Vittenburg.
