= Charlesbreen =

Glacier in Oscar II Land at Spitsbergen, Svalbard

Coordinates: 78.5068°N 13.3609°E

Charlesbreen is a glacier in Oscar II Land at Spitsbergen, Svalbard. It is located between Gunnar Knudsenfjella and Vegardfjella, and debouches into St. Jonsfjorden from the south side. The length of the glacier is ten kilometers. The glacier is named after Charles Robertson.
