= Dalsenget tram stop =

Former tram depot in Elgeseter, Trondheim, Norway

Coordinates: 63.4152778°N 10.3933669°E

Dalsenget
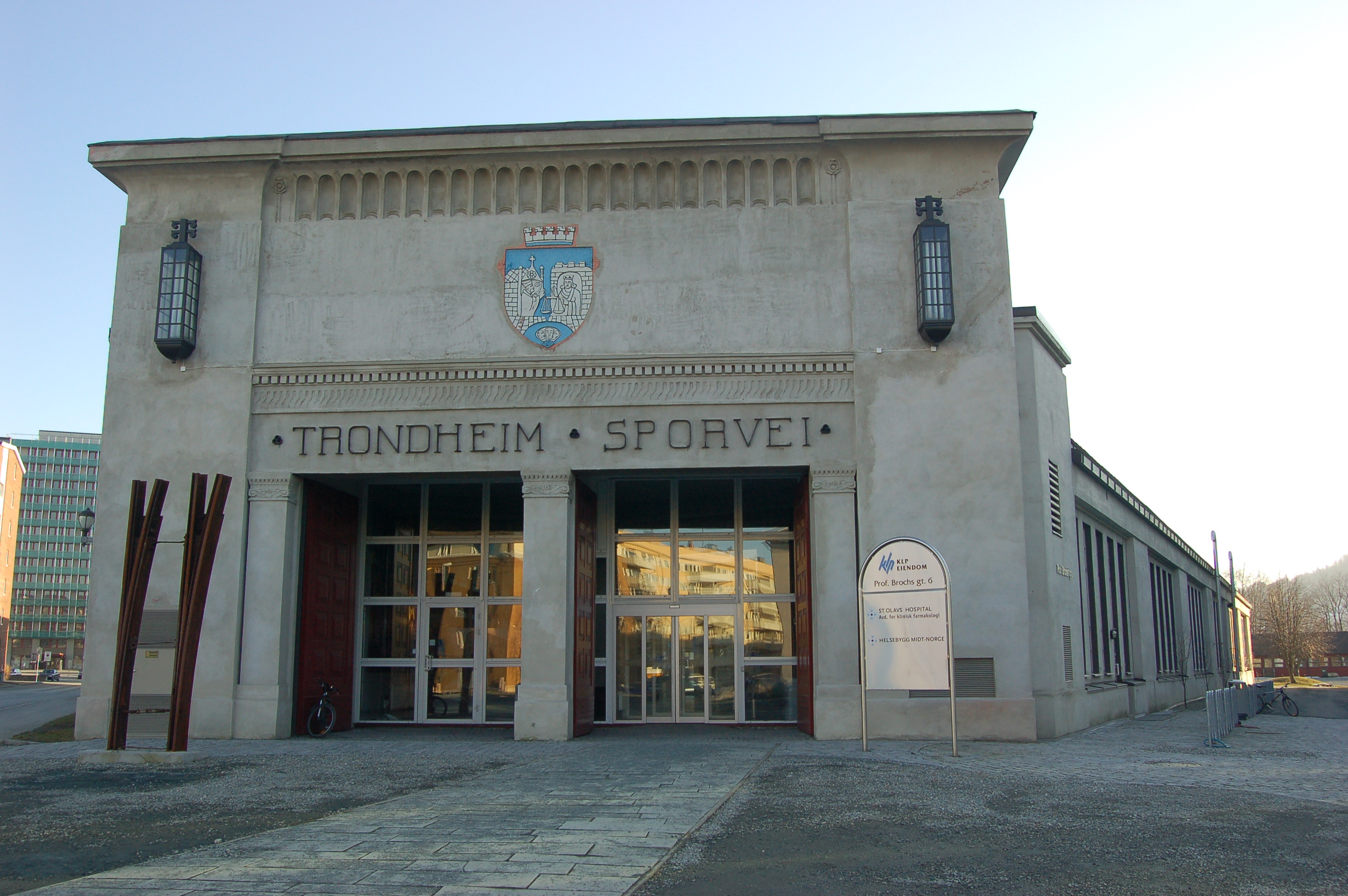
- Dalsenget depot has been converted to an office building

General information
- Location: Elgeseter
- Line: Elgeseterlinjen

History
- Opened: 1923
- Closed: 1983
Location

Dalsenget was a tram stop and terminus on the Elgeseter Line of the Trondheim Tramway between 1923 and 1983 and the site of a tram depot during this period.

== History ==
In 1923 a new tram line was built to Elgeseter and a new depot was built at the terminus. After the closure of the tram line the depot building was converted to an office building and is now owned by KLP Eiendom.
