= Leif Holbæk-Hanssen =

Norwegian economist and anthropologist

Leif Holbæk-Hanssen (27 March 1917 – 10 April 1991) was a Norwegian professor of economics and anthroposophist.

== Biography ==
Holbæk-Hanssen was born in Kristiania (Oslo), Norway, the son of dentist Harald Paul Holbæk-Hanssen (1889–1963) and Ingrid Siewers (1890–1921). He finished his secondary education in Fredrikstad in 1936, worked in marketing in Bergen before studying further at Copenhagen Business School, from where he graduated in 1940. In 1941, he married Synnøve Louise Krogness, daughter of Ole Andreas Krogness.

Holbæk-Hanssen worked in advertising, marketing and polling before being given a fellowship at the Norwegian School of Economics and Business Administration in 1957. He was appointed Professor in market economy in 1960. He was the first professor of his kind in Norway. In 1967 he was decorated with the Royal Norwegian Order of St. Olav for his pioneer work.

He was prorector from 1970 to 1972, and retired in 1976. His main work was Metoder og modeller i markedsføringen ("Methods and Models in Marketing"), released in three volumes between 1973 and 1976. He was also chairman of the Chr. Michelsen Institute from 1970 to 1982.

Holbæk-Hanssen was active in the anthroposophical movement, and was one of the founders of what has since evolved into Cultura Bank. In 2009, a collection of his writings titled Økonomi og samfunn - når mennesket blir viktigst was published by Antropos Forlag. Professor Ove Jakobsen at Bodø Graduate School of Business/University of Nordland, one of Holbæk-Hanssen's Dr. Oecon. students was an important mentor in this work.

== Literature ==
- Leif Holbæk-Hanssen, Økonomi og samfunn - når mennesket blir viktigst, Antropos Forlag, 2009, ISBN 978-82-7940-084-4
