= Carlsfjella =

Mountain ridge in Spitsbergen, Norway

Coordinates: 78.6334°N 13.0310°E

Carlsfjella is a mountain ridge in Oscar II Land at Spitsbergen, Svalbard. The ridge has a length of 14 kilometers, is located between St. Jonsfjorden and Løvenskioldfonna, and includes Valentinryggen, Patronen, Knausen and Haraldfjellet. The ridge is named after land owner Carl Otto Løvenskiold.
