= Vintervegen =

Glacier in Svalbard, Norway

Coordinates: 78.5851°N 13.4850°E

Vintervegen (Winter Road) is a glacier in Oscar II Land at Spitsbergen, Svalbard. It has a length of about 7.5 kilometers (4.7 mi). The glacier borders to the mountain of Klampen, merges with Osbornebreen and other glaciers, and the merged glacier stream debouches into the head of St. Jonsfjorden.
