= Svartfjella =

Mountainous area in Spitsbergen, Svalbard, Norway

Coordinates: 78.45°N 12.54°E

Svartfjella ("The Black Mountains") is a mountainous area in Oscar II Land in Spitsbergen, Svalbard. It is located between the glacier of Bullbreen and the lowland of Svartfjellstranda, on the eastern side of Forlandsundet. The highest peak is at altitude 674 metres, and the area extends over a length of about 4.5 kilometers.
