= Holmesletfjella =

Mountain range in Svalbard, Norway

Coordinates: 78.48°N 12.87°E

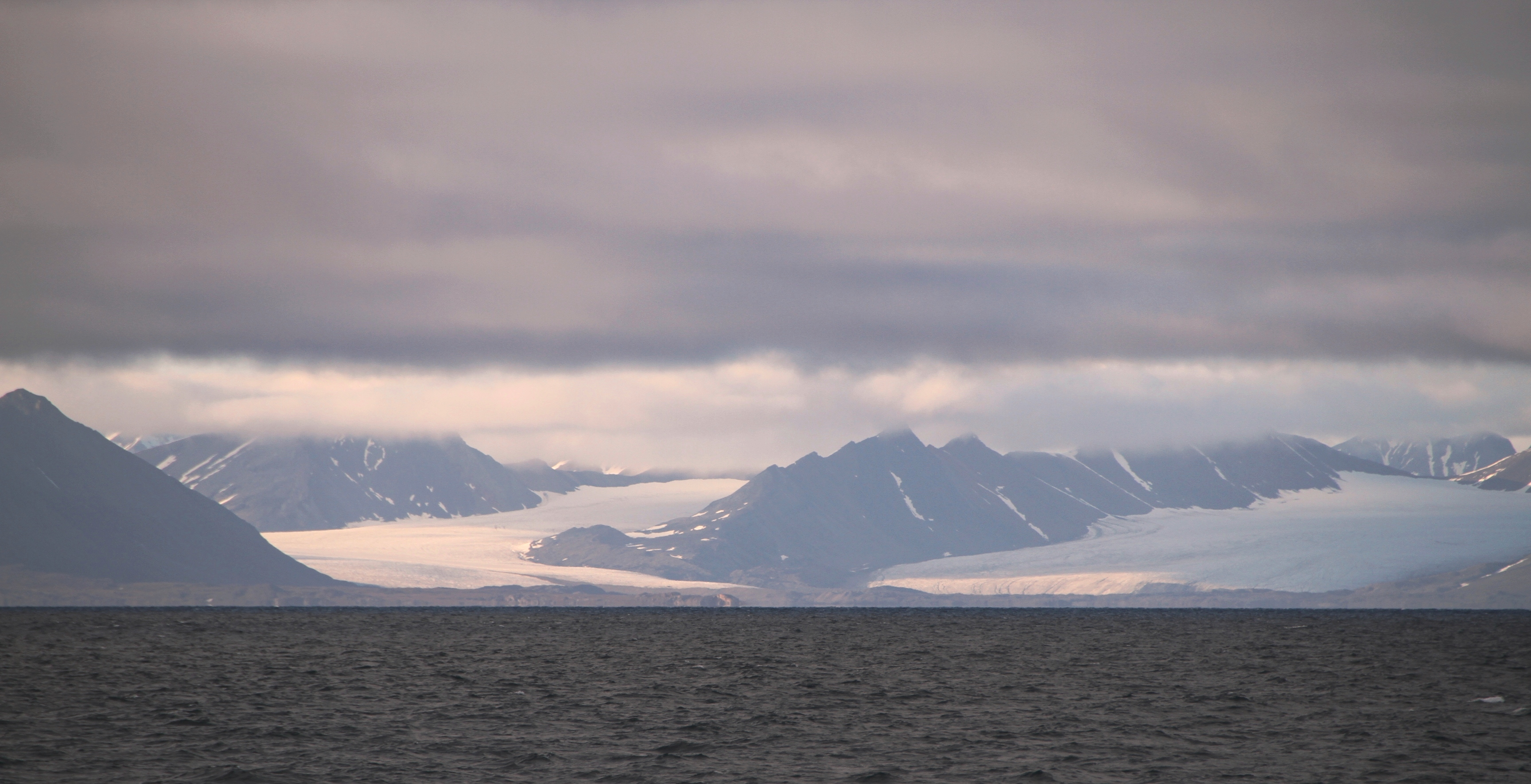

Holmesletfjella is a mountain range in Oscar II Land at Spitsbergen, Svalbard. The range extends about seven kilometers, and comprises several peaks and the four kilometer long ridge of Skipperryggen. Holmesletfjella are located south of St. Jonsfjorden, between Løvliebreen and Bullbreen. They are named after captain and ship owner Hans Holmeslet.
