= Gaffelbreen =

Glacier in Svalbard, Norway

Coordinates: 78.5685°N 12.8818°E

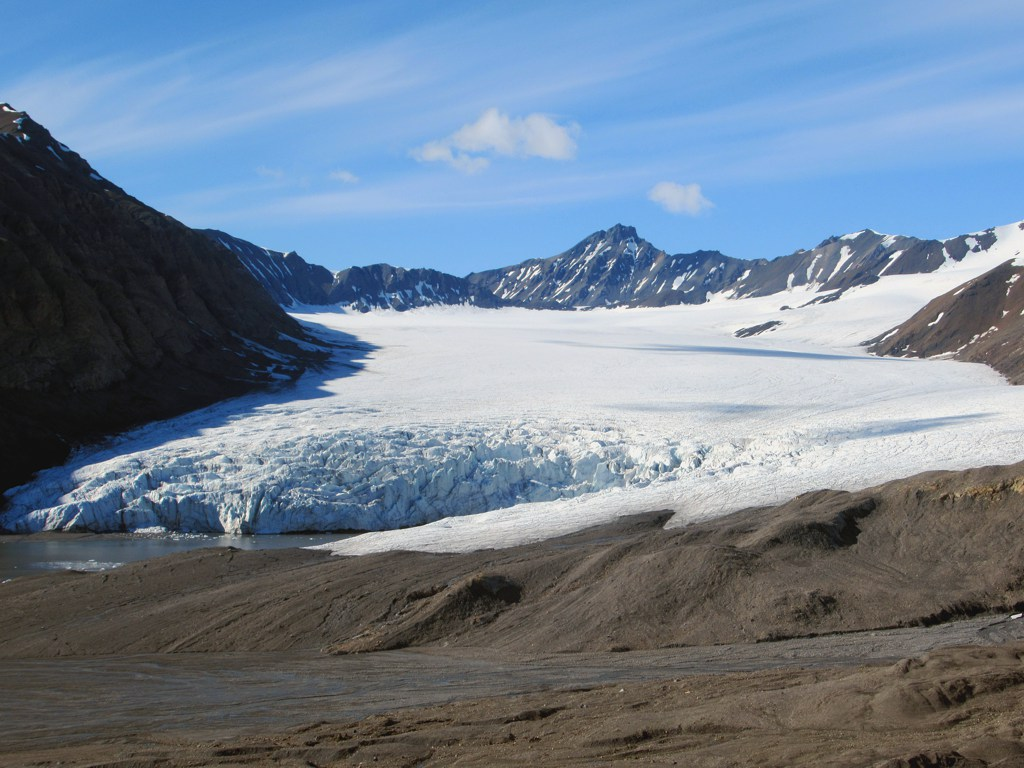
Gaffelbreen Glacier

Gaffelbreen (English: fork glacier) is a glacier in Oscar II Land at Spitsbergen, Svalbard. It has a length of seven kilometers, and debouches into St. Jonsfjorden, from the northern side. The upper part of the glacier is split into two branches.
