= Bakke Church (Buskerud) =

Church in Buskerud, Norway

- Bakke kirke
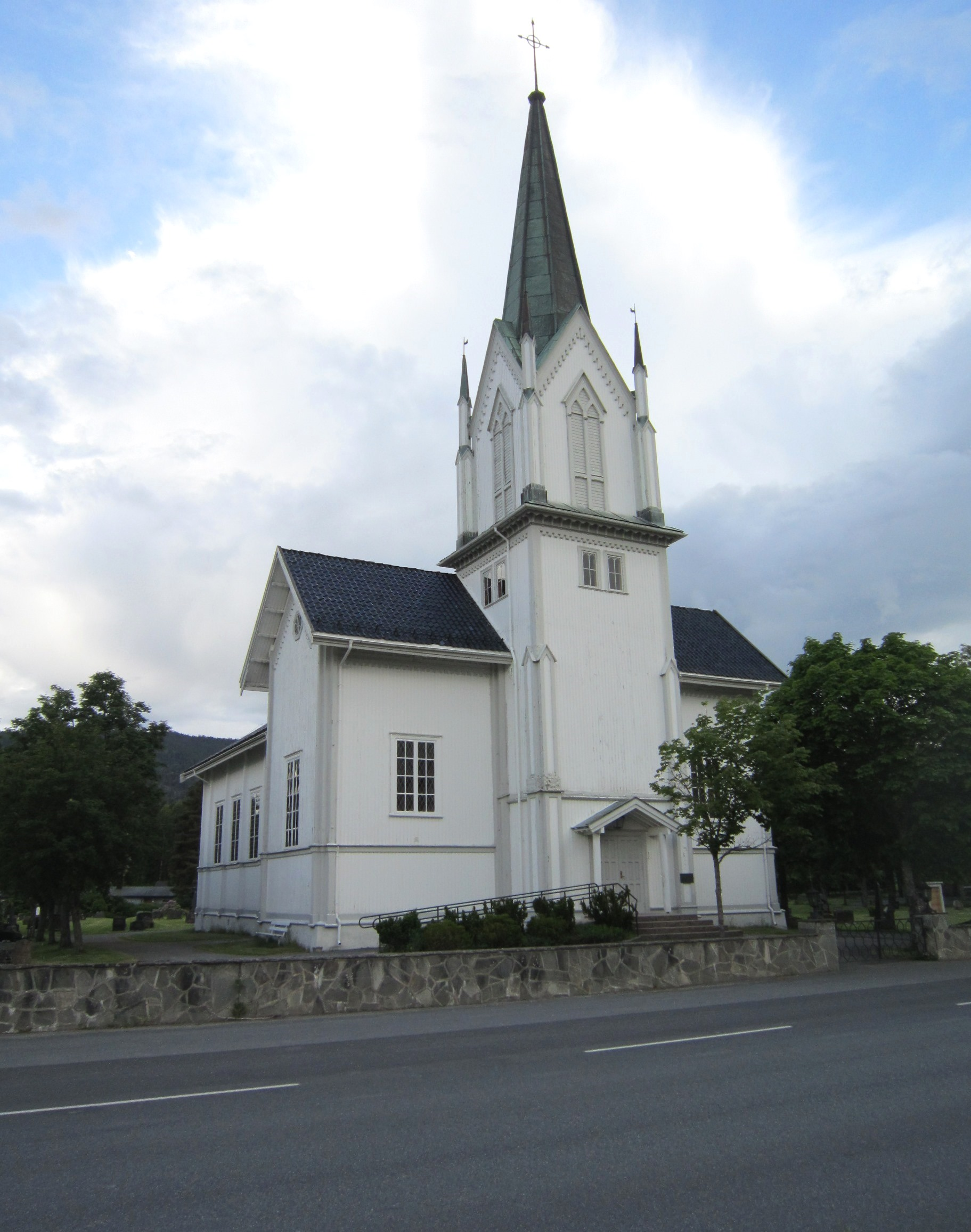
- View of the church
- Bakke Church
- 59°50′09″N 9°52′22″E
- Location: Øvre Eiker, Buskerud
- Country: Norway
- Denomination: Church of Norway
- Churchmanship: Evangelical Lutheran

History
- Status: Parish church
- Founded: 1804
- Consecrated: 10 Oct 1883

Architecture
- Functional status: Active
- Architect: Diedrich Andreas Omejer
- Architectural type: Long church
- Completed: 1883 (143 years ago)

Specifications
- Capacity: 250
- Materials: Wood

Administration
- Diocese: Tunsberg
- Deanery: Eiker prosti
- Parish: Bakke
- Norwegian Cultural Heritage Site
- Type: Church
- Status: Listed
- ID: 83840

Bakke Church (Norwegian: Bakke kirke) is a parish church of the Church of Norway in Øvre Eiker Municipality in Buskerud county, Norway. It is located in the village of Skotselv. It is one of the churches for the Bakke parish which is part of the Eiker prosti (deanery) in the Diocese of Tunsberg. The white, wooden church was built in a long church design in 1883 using plans drawn up by the architect . The church seats about 250 people.

== History ==
The Hassel Iron Works started in 1649 near Skotselv. In 1752 royal permission was given to build a church for the workers at the company's expense on Ulveland farm. However, nothing came of it at that time and the church was not built. New permission was obtained in 1803, and a new church was completed in 1804. It was an octagonal log building with a tower. Initially, the walls were left as logs, but in 1818 the walls were paneled over and painted. In 1847 it got a new tower. An oral tradition has it that the church had a pulpit altar with an entrance from the loft on the outside of the church. The church is said to have had second floor seating galleries along the long sides of the nave.

In the 1860s, there was a desire for a new, larger church building, but it was not until 1880 that plans were submitted to the district council, and royal permission was granted the following year. The new church was designed by architect Diedrich Andreas Omejer (spelled Ohmeier in some sources), and the builder A. Eilertsen led the construction process. The new Bakke Church was built just northeast of the old church and consecrated on 10 October 1883. The old church was torn down the following year and the materials used in a community center in Modum Municipality, which later burned down. The new church is a timber-framed long church. The church has an entrance in the east and a choir (with a sacristy as an extension) in the west. The choir floor is raised three steps above the nave floor, and there is an organ gallery above the entrance in the east.

== Media gallery ==
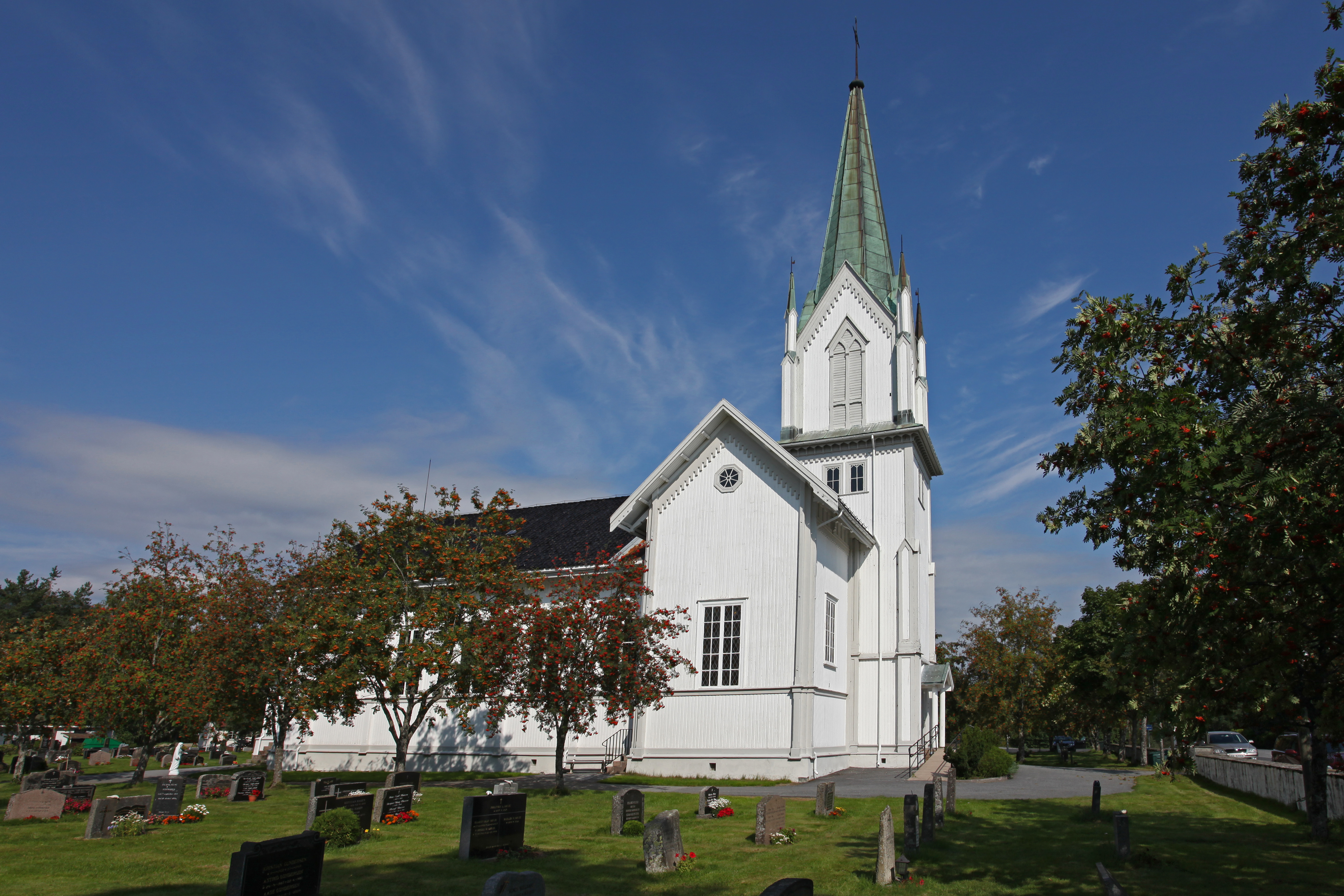

== See also ==
- List of churches in Tunsberg
