= St. Olav's University Hospital =

St Olav's University Hospital
- St. Olavs Hospital Trust

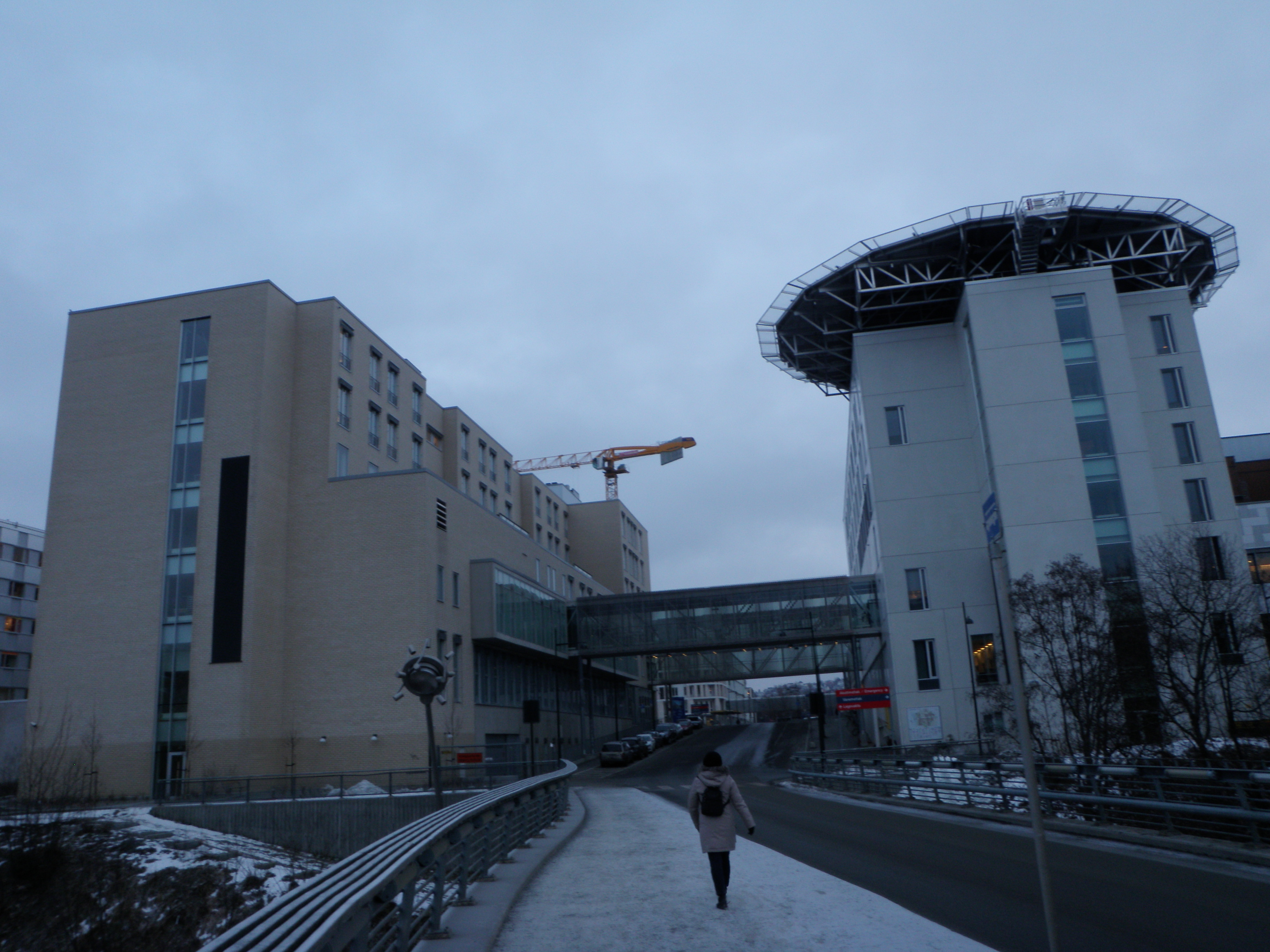
- St. Olav's seen from Nidelva

Geography
- Location: Øya, Trondheim, Norway
- Coordinates: 63°25′15″N 10°23′16″E

Organisation
- Care system: Government
- Type: Teaching
- Affiliated university: Norwegian University of Science and Technology

Services
- Emergency department: Yes

Helipads
- Helipad: ICAO: ENTR

History
- Opened: June 18, 1902

Links
- Website: https://www.stolav.no/
- Lists: Hospitals in Norway

St. Olav's University Hospital (Norwegian: St. Olavs Hospital - Universitetssykehuset i Trondheim) is the hospital in Trondheim, Norway located at Øya. It is part of St. Olavs Hospital Trust that operates all the hospitals in Sør-Trøndelag and thus indirectly state owned. It cooperates closely with the Norwegian University of Science and Technology in research and in education of medical doctors. The university is named for Olaf II of Norway, also known as St. Olav.

It performed 274,441 somatic and 88,692 psychiatric consultations in 2005 with 8,691 employees and a budget of Norwegian krone 5.1 billion. Trondheim Heliport, St. Olav's Hospital (ICAO: ENTR) is a helipad located adjacent to the emergency ward. It opened on 1 February 2010 and has a fuel tank.

== History ==
The hospital was created in 1902 when the New Trondheim Hospital was built at Øya and on June 18 the first patient was accepted. Sør-Trøndelag county municipality increased its ownership from one third to half in 1948 and in 1950 it changed its name to Trondheim Central Hospital. In 1959 the first part of the central section with six stories is built, expanded in 1974 to ten. In 1964 the county took over the responsibility for the hospital and renamed to Trondheim Regional Hospital two years later. The clinical education starts in 1975 in cooperation with the University of Bergen, with 43 doctors graduating in 1980.

Through the late 1990s and early 2000s a major debate about the location was initiated, with a suggestion to move the entire hospital to Dragvoll on the outskirts of the city. The background was the need for en entirely new hospital, and on May 28, 2002 Storting decided to build an entirely new hospital at Øya. The same year the Government, through Central Norway Regional Health Authority had taken over the responsibility for the hospital. The first new buildings were opened in 2005.
