= Elgeseter Bridge =

Bridge in Norway

Elgeseter Bridge Elgeseter bru
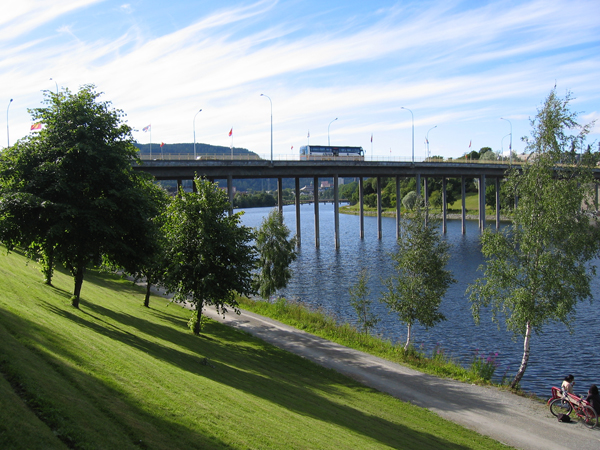
- View of the bridge
- Coordinates: 63.4211°N 10.3933°E
- Carries: Four lanes on E6
- Crosses: Nidelva
- Locale: Trondheim, Norway

Characteristics
- Total length: 220 metres (720 ft)
- Width: 23.4 metres (77 ft)
- Height: 16.5 metres (54 ft)
- Longest span: 22.5 metres (74 ft)
- No. of spans: 8
- Piers in water: 6
- Clearance above: 15.1 metres (50 ft)

History
- Construction start: 1949
- Construction end: 1951

Elgeseter Bridge (Norwegian: Elgeseter bru) is a bridge in the city and municipality of Trondheim in Trøndelag county, Norway. It is part of the European route E6 highway which passes over the Nidelva river and connects Prinsens street in the Midtbyen area of Trondheim with Elgeseter street in the Elgeseter area of Trondheim in the south. The Trondheim city council decided on 17 March 1949 that the bridge should be built. Elgeseter bridge was opened in 1951 after a construction period of 2 years.

== History ==
The main entryway into Trondheim for hundreds of years has been at Elgeseter; the first bridge here is mentioned in 1178. It was on this bridge that the battle between the birkebeiners and the baglers took place in 1199. Two years after the city was destroyed by fire in 1681, the Old Town Bridge (Norwegian: Gamle Bybro) was built. Until then the Elgeseter Bridge was the only connection across the Nidelva. The bridge has been reconstructed many times. In the 16th century it was for a period called "Gårdsbroen" and "Kanikke bro". After the Old Town Bridge was completed, the bridge to Elgeseter fell to decay, and collapsed.

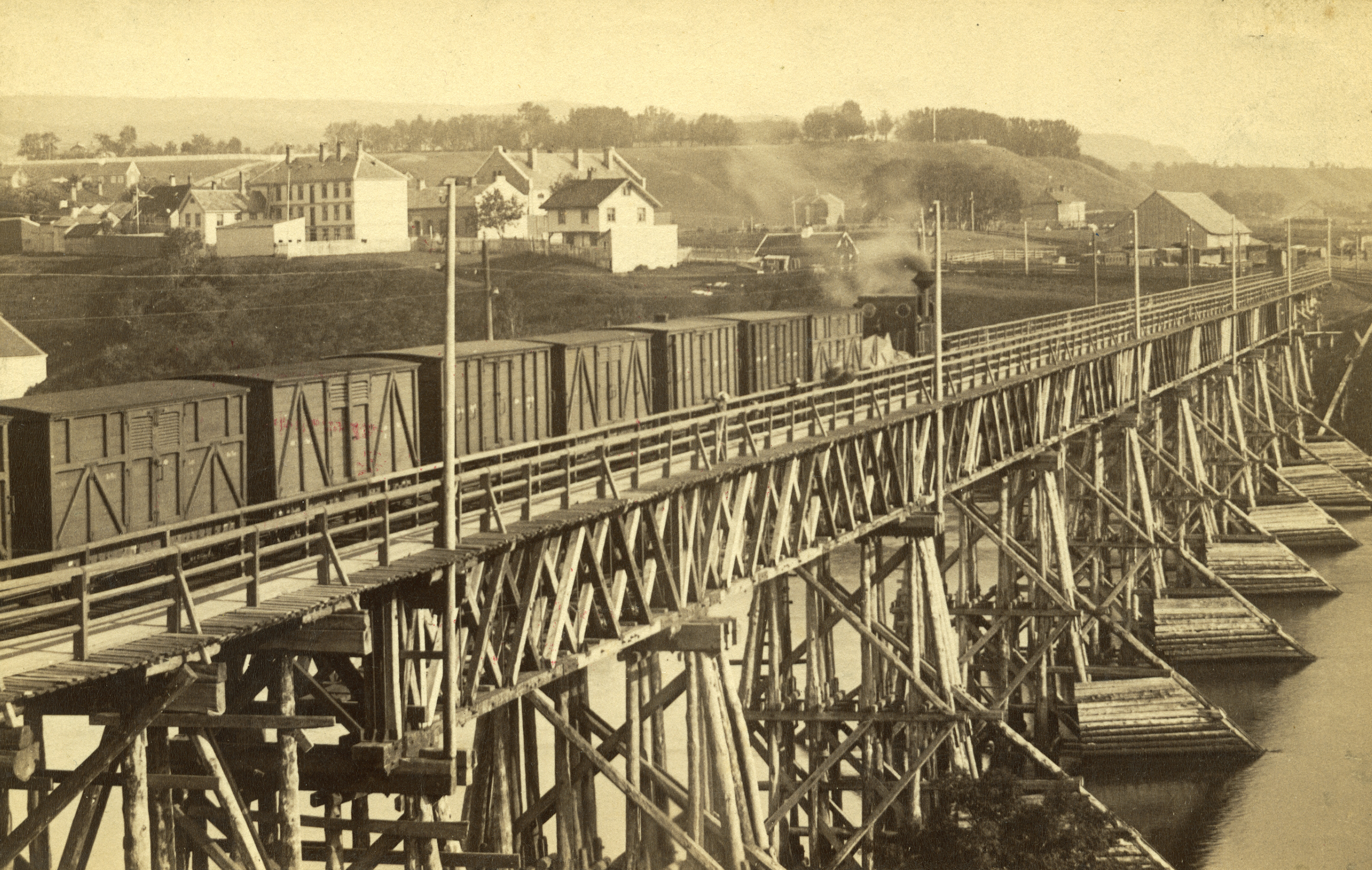
Trondhjem–Støren Line train on Kongsgårds bro

In 1863 a wooden railway bridge was constructed at that location for the Trondhjem-Størenbanen railway line to Trondheim. This bridge was called "Kongsgårds bro". The railway bridge was converted into a roadway bridge in 1885, after the train station was relocated to Brattøra.

== Media gallery ==
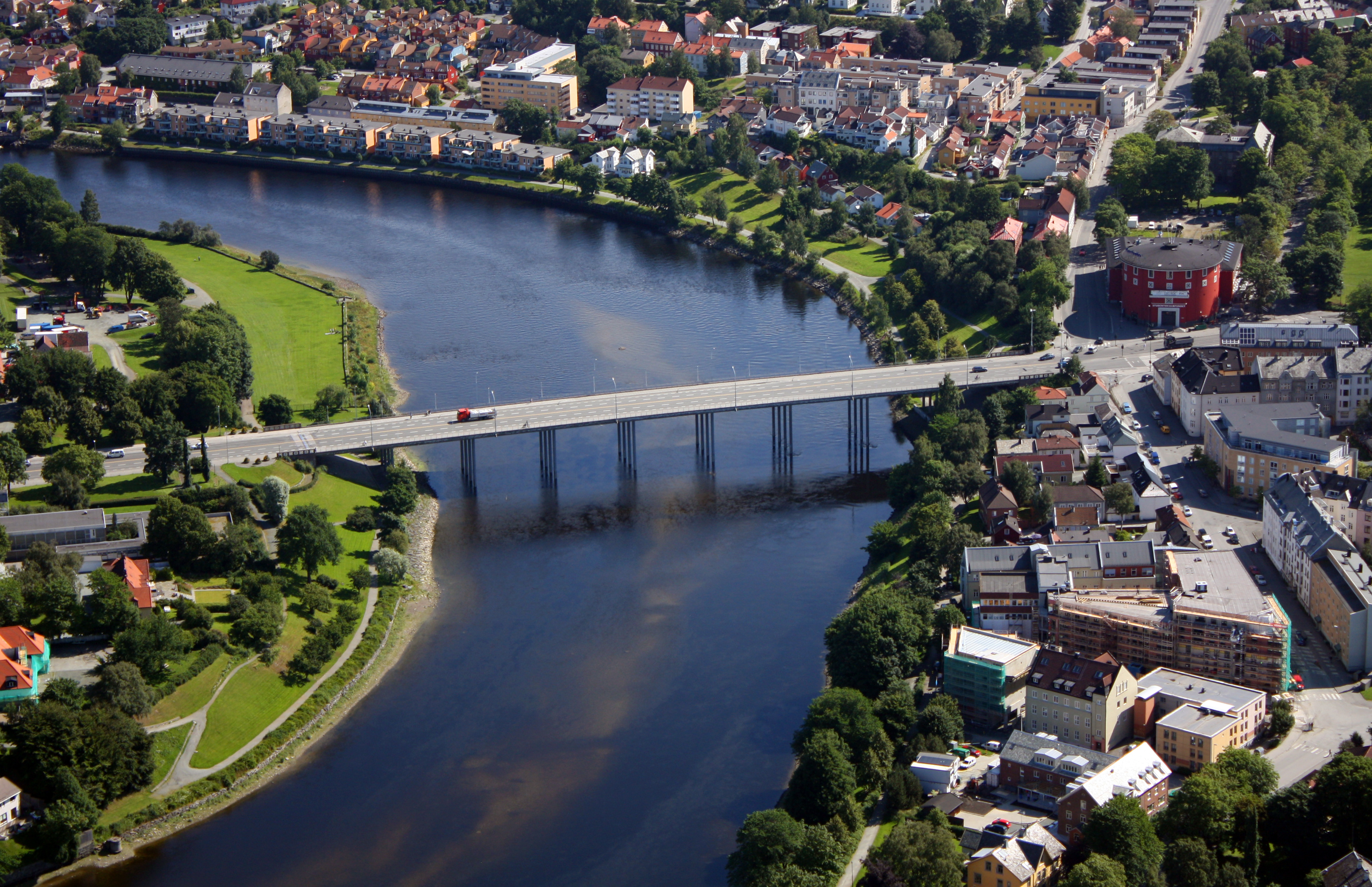
View of the bridge from the air

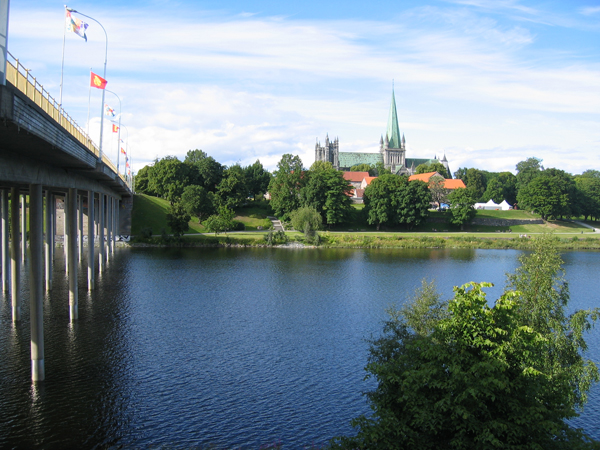
Looking north (Nidaros Cathedral in the distance)

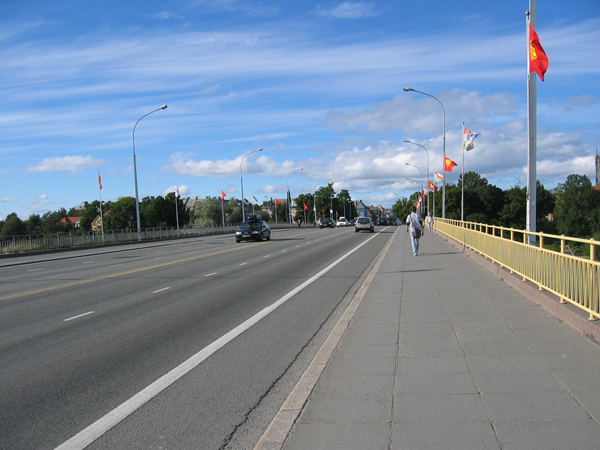
View of the roadway on the bridge

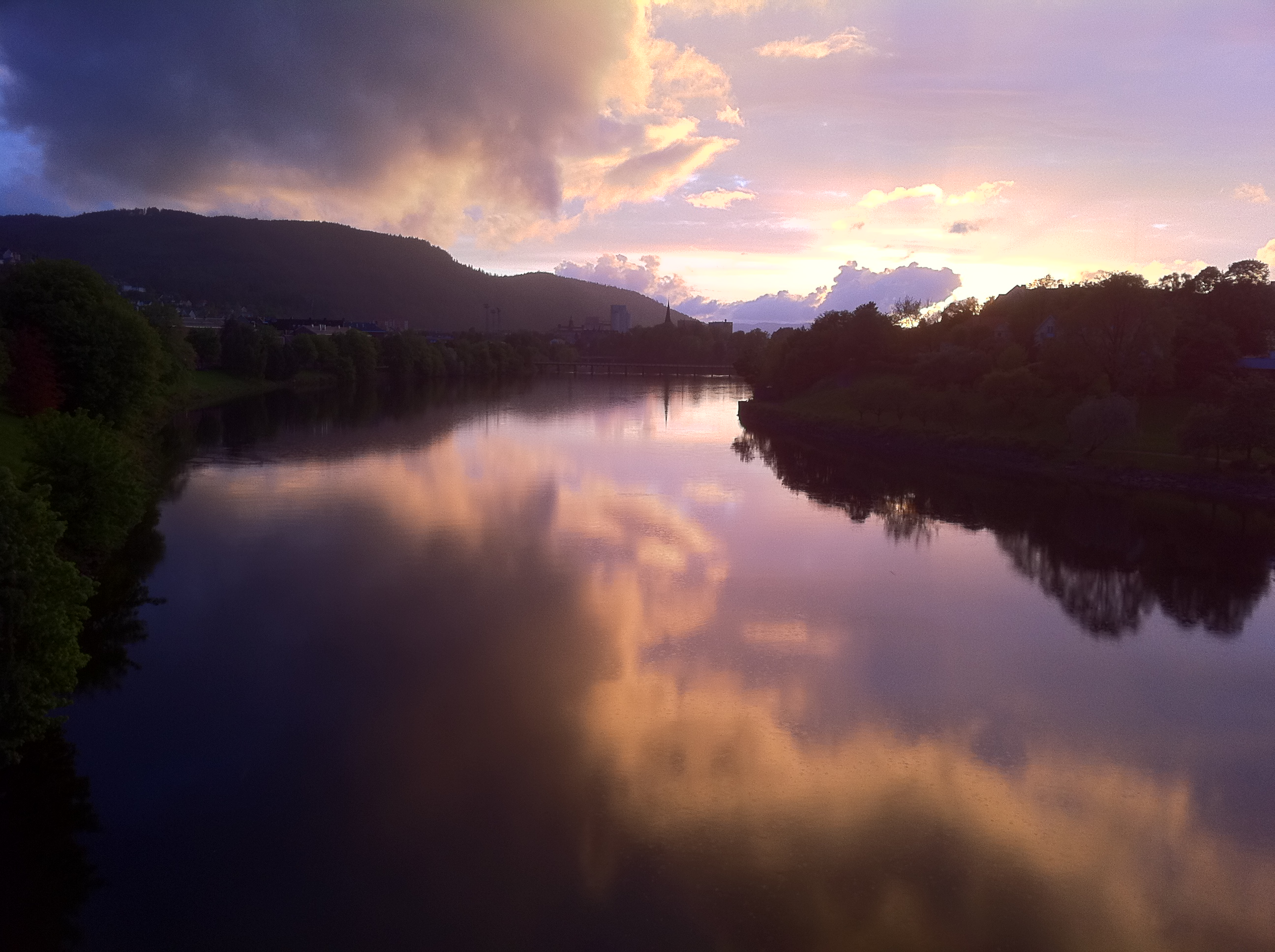
View from the bridge looking west towards Ila.

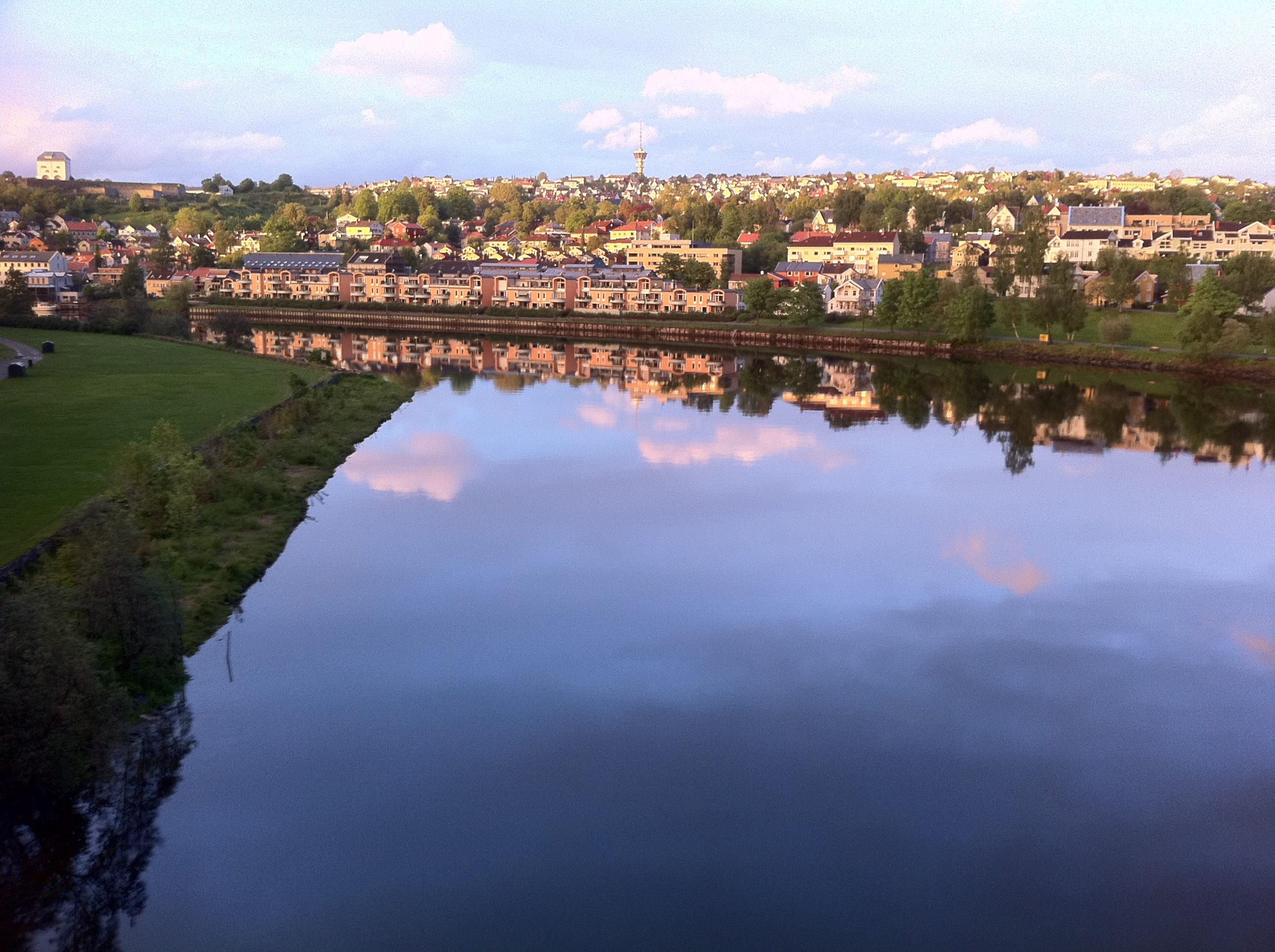
View from the bridge looking east towards Bakklandet and surrounding areas.

== See also ==
- List of bridges in Norway
- List of bridges in Norway by length
