= Olaf Devik =

Norwegian physicist and civil servant

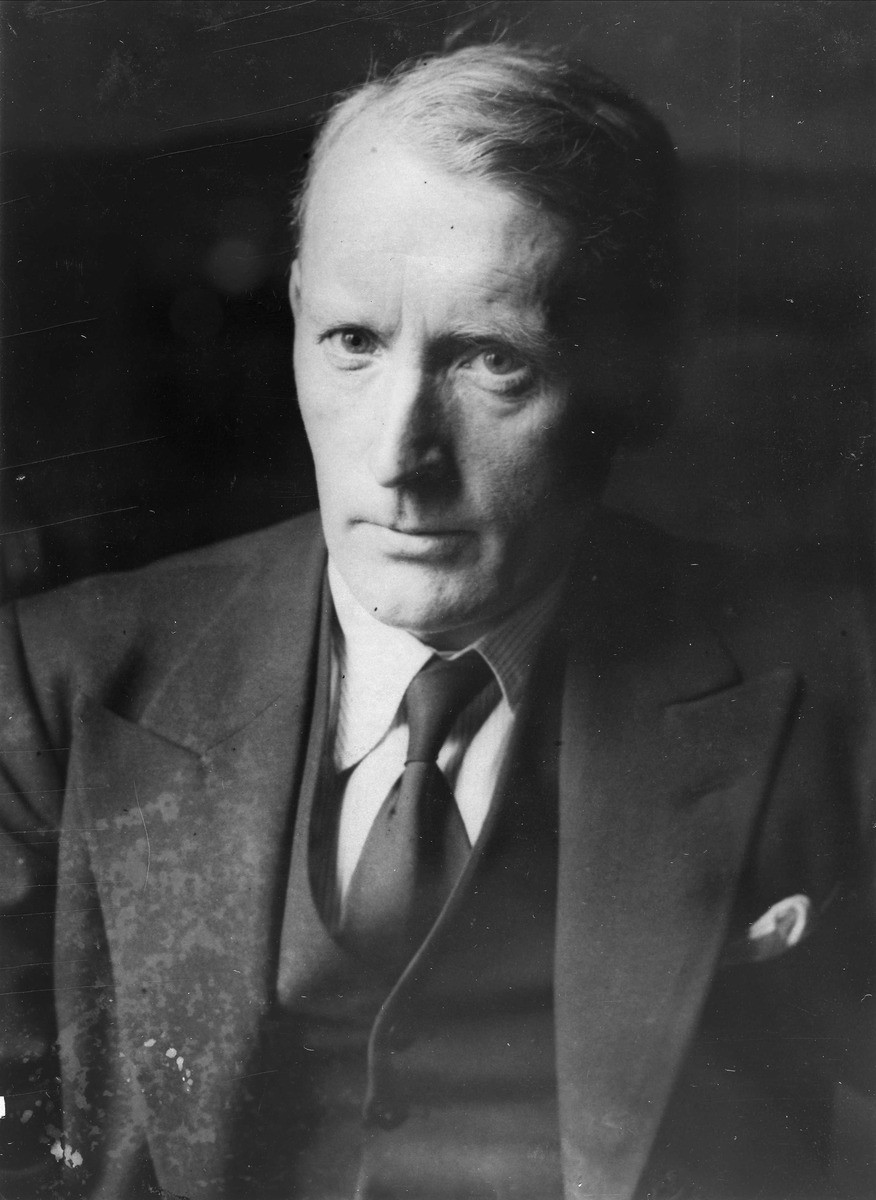

Deputy under-secretary of state in the Ministry of Church and Education
- In office 1938–1941, –1956

Personal details
- Born: 20 December 1886 Gjerdrum Municipality
- Died: 14 April 1987 (aged 100)
- Known for: Værvarslinga for Nord-Norge
- Awards: Royal Norwegian Order of St. Olav; Commander of the Order of the Dannebrog; Commander of the Order of the Polar Star

Academic background
- Education: Royal Frederick University
- Thesis: Thermische und dynamische Bedingungen der Eisbildung in Wasserläufen

Academic work
- Discipline: physics meteorology
- Sub-discipline: geophysics
- Notable works: Lærebok i fysikk for middelskolen

Olaf Martin Devik (20 December 1886 – 14 April 1987) was a Norwegian physicist and civil servant. He worked in academia until 1938, when he became an official in the Norwegian Ministry of Church and Education. During the German occupation of Norway, he fled the country and worked with its government in exile. After the war, he returned to the education ministry until his retirement.

== Family and early life ==
Devik was born in Gjerdrum Municipality to headmaster Ole Gabriel Johnsen Devik and his wife Marthe Klausdatter Lønnebotn. His parents hailed from Gloppen Municipality and Hyllestad Municipality. He took the examen artium at Kristiania Cathedral School in 1904, and graduated from the Royal Frederick University with the cand.real. degree in 1911. Starting in 1908 he worked as an assistant to Vilhelm Bjerknes in geophysics and meteorology. He was subsequently an assistant to Kristian Birkeland from 1911, studied at the University of Heidelberg from 1913 to 1914, and was hired at the Royal Frederick University in 1914. From 1915 to 1918, he worked and lived at Haldde in Alta Municipality, together with Ole Andreas Krogness, who ran an aurora borealis observatory. The two successfully suggested the establishment of a geophysical institute in Tromsø; both moved there to work in 1918. Their work culminated in the establishment of Værvarslinga for Nord-Norge, the weather forecast for Northern Norway, in 1922.

In 1922 Devik was appointed to the position of Physics Docent at the Norwegian Institute of Technology. From 1923 to 1932 he held lectures in physics at Noregs lærarhøgskule. Together with school teacher Sverre Bruun he wrote textbooks for schools: Lærebok i fysikk for middelskolen (1928) and Lærebok i fysikk for realgymnasiet (1933). Their book was reissued many times, and competed with Daniel Isaachsen and Gabriel Gabrielsen Holtsmark's Fysikk for gymnasiet. Bruun and Devik released Lærebok i fysikk for realskolen og de to første klassene i gymnaset (1939, later reissued) and Lærebok i fysikk for ungdomsskolen (1964, later reissued). In 1931 Devik published the thesis Thermische und dynamische Bedingungen der Eisbildung in Wasserläufen, which earned him the dr.philos. degree in 1932. In the same year he started working for the Chr. Michelsen Institute.

== Government service ==
In 1938 Devik left academia and became deputy under-secretary of state in the Ministry of Church and Education. Following the German invasion and occupation of Norway in April 1940, Devik continued at the request of Norway's exiled government, but he was fired in 1941. He was offered a professorship, but declined and spent the next year as a freelance lecturer. In 1942 he was fired from that job too, and in 1943 he fled to the United Kingdom where he worked for the government-in-exile for the rest of the war. After the war he returned to the Ministry of Church and Education, retiring in 1956. The years saw the beginning of the huge growth in higher education in Norway. Among others, the Norwegian State Educational Loan Fund, the University of Bergen and SINTEF were created.

While studying he chaired the Norwegian Christian Student Association for a semester. He was a board member of the Norwegian Broadcasting Corporation from 1934. After the war he was a board member of the Foundation for Student Life in Oslo, and he was a member of NTNF from 1946 to 1959 and NAVF from 1949 to 1957. He was a member of the Royal Norwegian Society of Sciences and Letters from 1928, the Norwegian Academy of Science and Letters from 1932 and the Norwegian Academy of Technological Sciences from 1956. He was an honorary member of the society Norsk Geofysisk Forening, and published a small 50th anniversary history of the society in 1967 together with Peter Martin Thrane. He was appointed to the First Class of the Royal Norwegian Order of St. Olav, as a Commander of the Order of the Dannebrog and as a Commander of the Order of the Polar Star. He was married to Dagny Othilie Hansen in July 1915, and died in April 1987 in Oslo.
