= Osbornebreen =

Glacier in Svalbard, Norway

Coordinates: 78°39′17″N 13°07′34″E

Osbornebreen viewed from the ocean

Osbornebreen is a glacier in Oscar II Land at Spitsbergen, Svalbard, Norway. It has a length of 21 kilometers, merges with the glaciers Devikbreen, Klampebreen and Vintervegen, and debouches into St. Jonsfjorden. The mountain ridge Goldschmidtfjella forms a six kilometer long nunatak in the glacier.
