= Bakklandet =

Neighborhood in the city of Trondheim, Norway

- Neighborhood in Trondheim
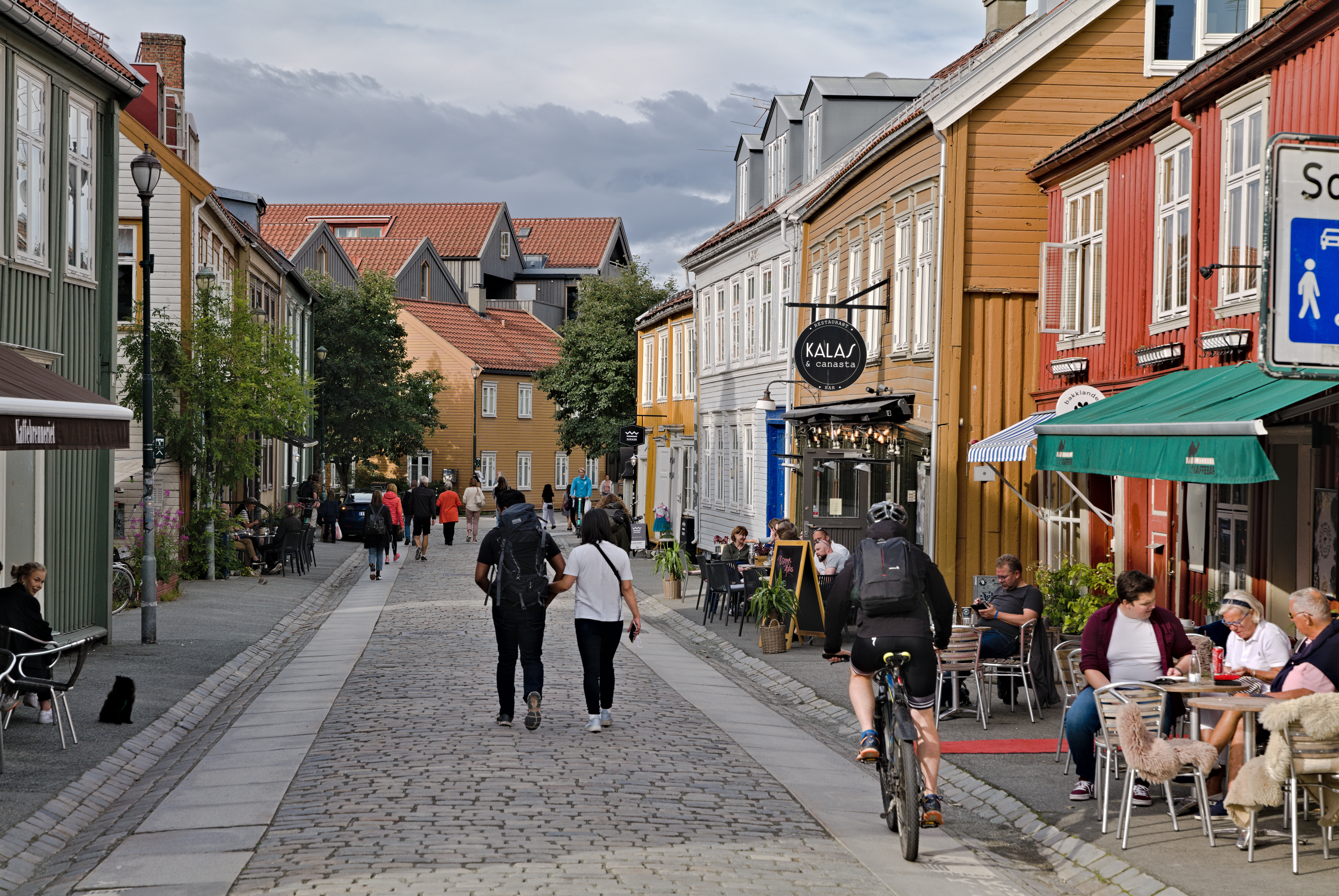
- View of the neighborhood in 2022
- Interactive map of Bakklandet
- Coordinates: 63.4282°N 10.4037°E
- Country: Norway
- Region: Central Norway
- County: Trøndelag
- Municipality: Trondheim Municipality
- Borough: Østbyen
- Elevation: 10 m (33 ft)
- Time zone: UTC+01:00 (CET)
  - Summer (DST): UTC+02:00 (CEST)

Bakklandet is a neighborhood in the city of Trondheim in Trøndelag county, Norway. It lies in the borough of Østbyen in Trondheim Municipality, on the east side of the Nidelva river between the Bakke Bridge (Bakke bru) and the Old Town Bridge (Gamle Bybro).

The neighborhood is dominated by small, wooden houses and narrow streets. It is among the major tourist attractions in the city.

In 1965, the road plan for Trondheim proposed that a large area in Bakklandet be demolished to make way for a four-lane motorway which would connect the road "Elgeseter gate" with the road "Innherredsveien". The plans were met by opposition from locals, and by the early 1980s the plan was shelved, even though the city's environmental council had approved depopulating the neighborhood in 1974.

== Media gallery ==
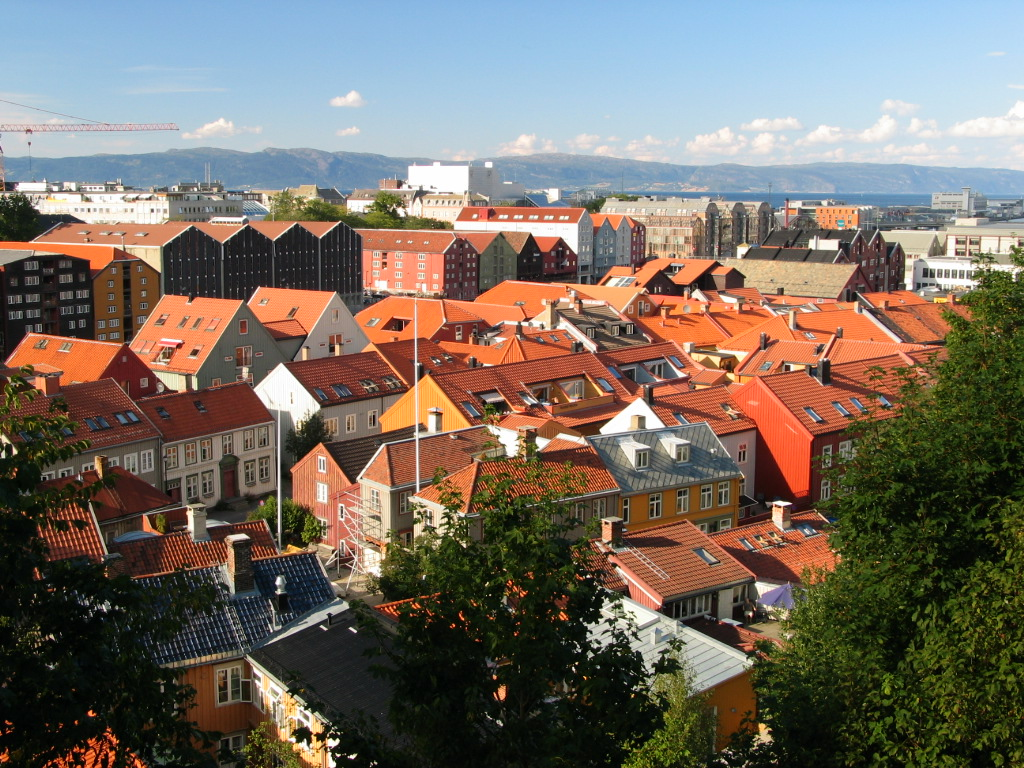
Overview

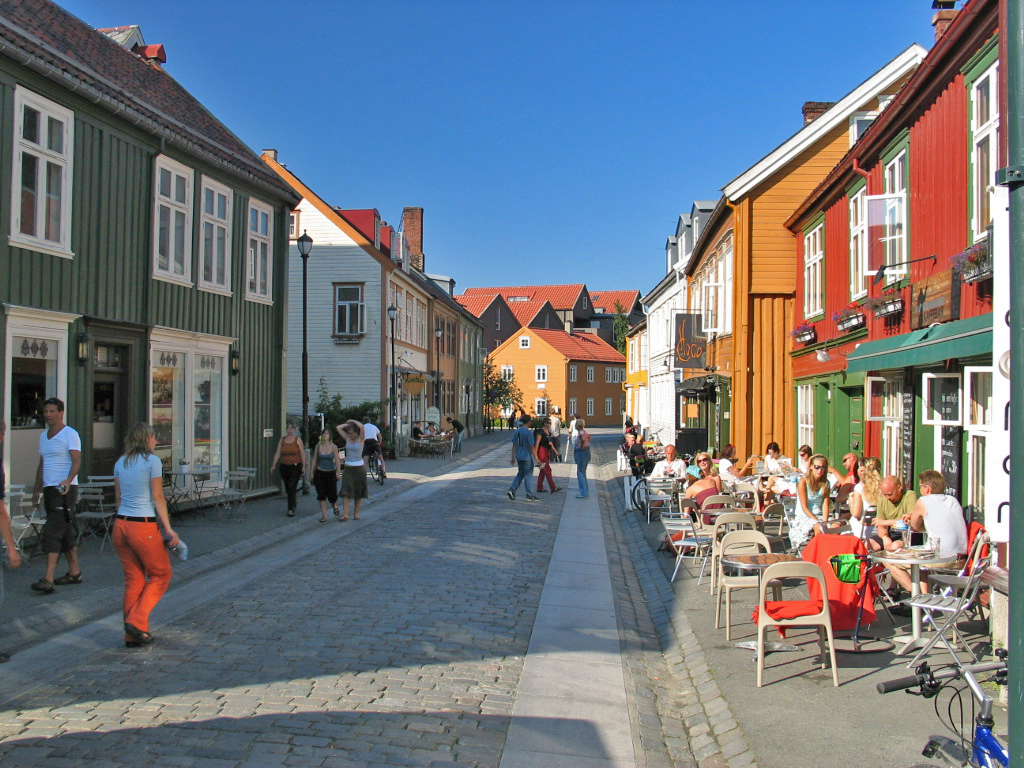
Bakklandet in 2006

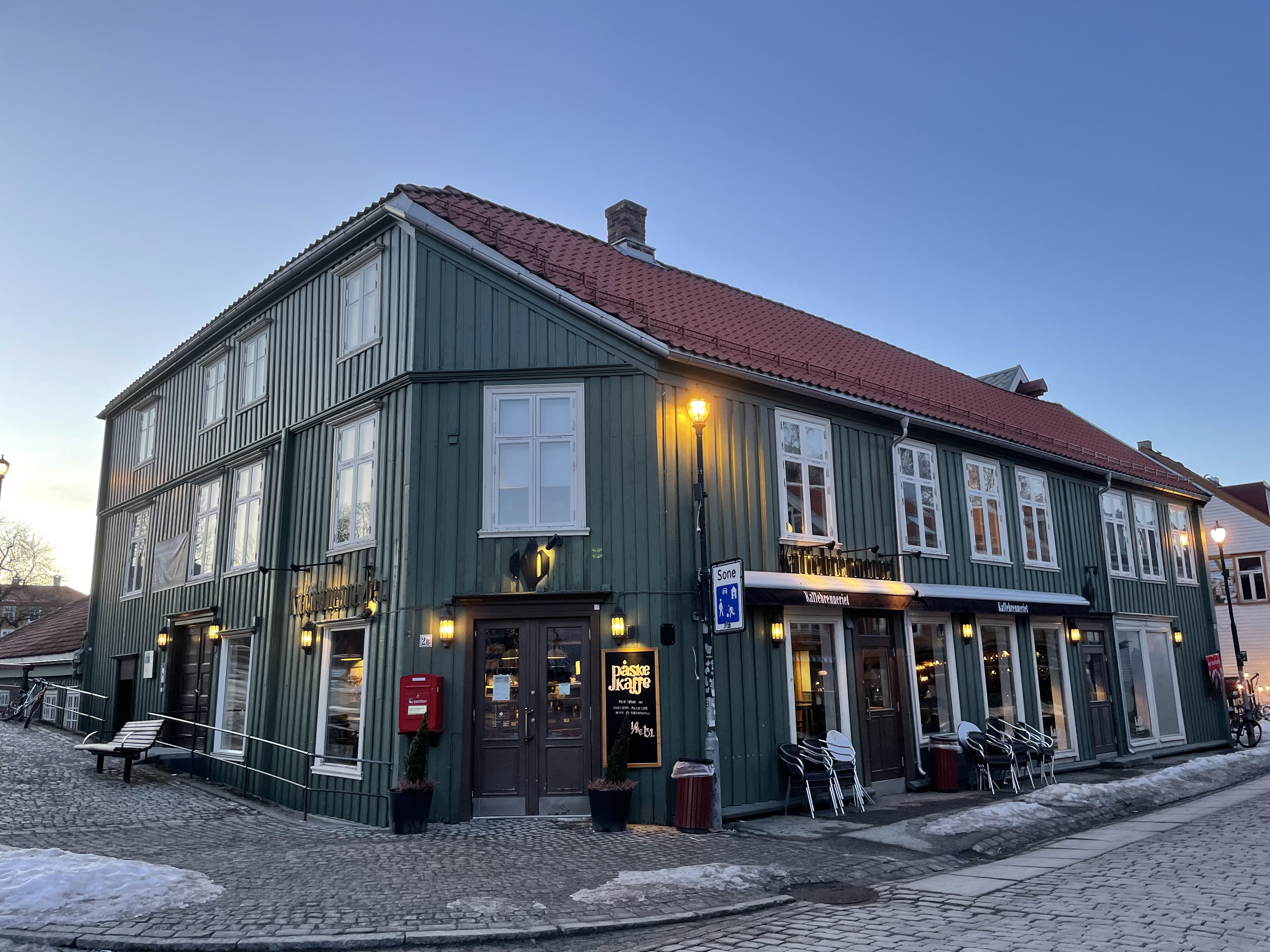

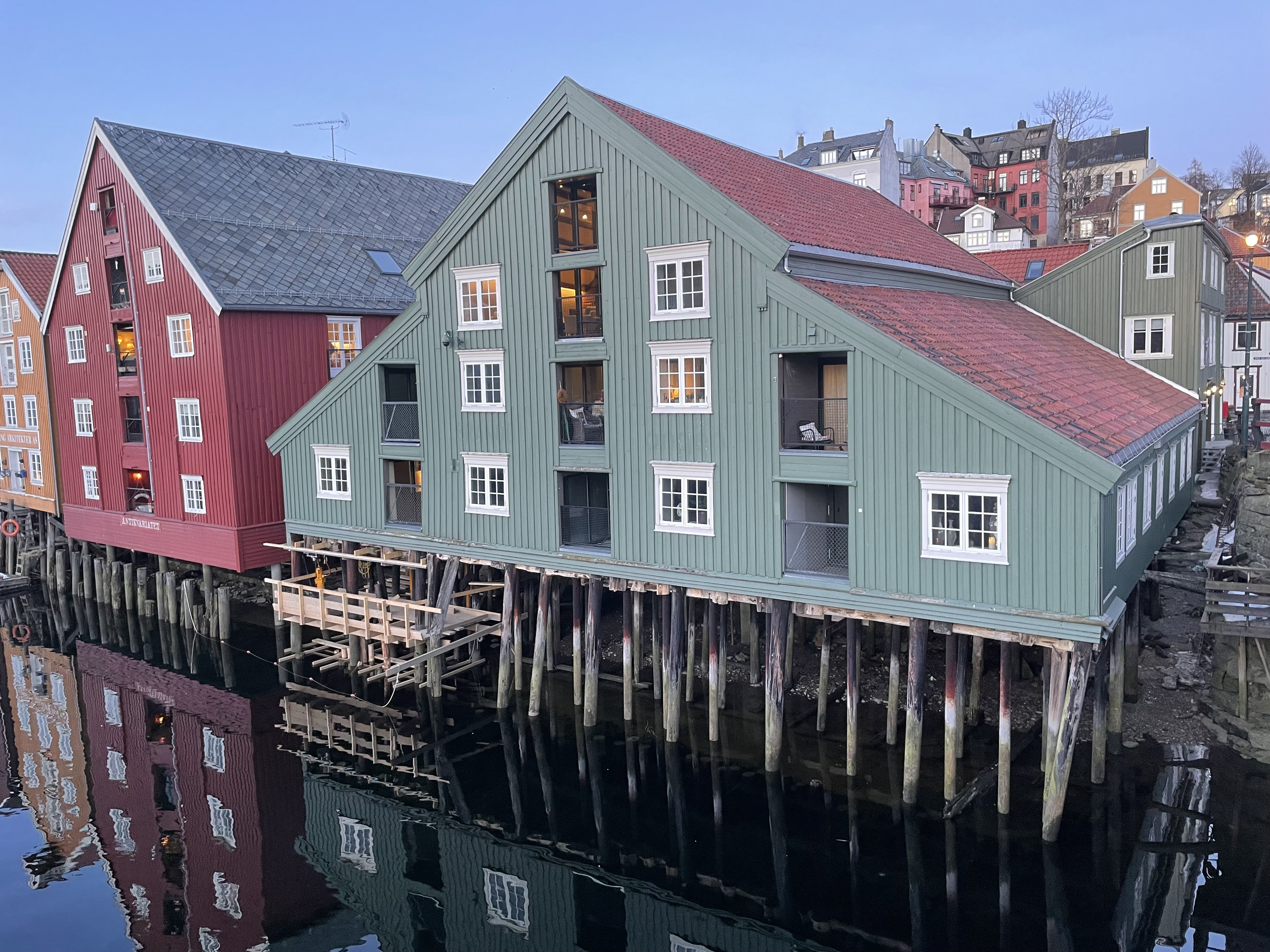
