= Ole Andreas Krogness (physicist) =

Norwegian physicist

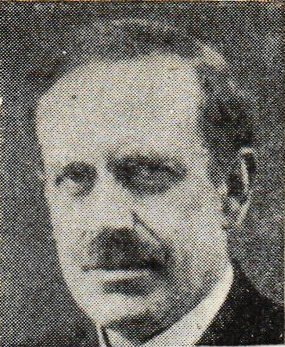
Ole Andreas Krogness

Ole Andreas Krogness (23 May 1886 – 28 May 1934) was a Norwegian physicist. He worked for the establishment of a geophysical institute in Tromsø, and served as the institute's manager from 1918 to 1922. He was instrumental in many geophysical accomplishments in northern Norway in the early 20th century.

== Early life and career ==
Krogness was born in Trondhjem as a son of curate Ole Andreas Tangen Krogness (1832–1887) and Christiane Augusta Lindeman (1850–1928). On the paternal side he was a grandson of businessperson and politician Ole Andreas Krogness, and on the maternal side he was a great-grandson of Ole Andreas Lindeman and a nephew of Anna Lindeman and Hans Thorvald Lindeman. He took the examen artium in 1904, and graduated from the Royal Frederick University with the cand.real. degree in 1912. From 1908 he worked as an assistant of Kristian Birkeland.

In June 1912 in Kristiania he married Dagny Vegerd Guldberg (1887–1978), and became a son-in-law of physician Carl Johan Guldberg. His daughter Synnøve, born 1915, married economist Leif Holbæk-Hanssen.

== Later career ==
In 1912 Krogness was hired as manager of the aurora borealis observatory at Haldde in Kåfjord, Alta. He also lived there with his family, and from 1915 he had company by fellow researcher Olaf Devik. The two successfully suggested the establishment of a geophysical institute in Tromsø; both moved there to work in 1918. Krogness was the institute's manager from 1918 to 1922. Their work culminated in the establishment of "Værvarslinga for Nord-Norge", the weather forecast of Northern Norway, in 1922.

Krogness also founded the magnetical observatory at Dombås in 1916, and in Tromsø Museum he was a board member from 1919 to 1923 and chairman from 1923 to 1928. He co-founded the nationwide Norsk Geofysisk Forening and chaired it from 1927 to 1928, and also founded the local branch of the Norwegian Polytechnic Society in Tromsø. He also co-founded the Komiteen for de Vitenskapelige Institusjoner i Tromsø, which proposed the establishment of a university in Northern Norway (the University of Tromsø opened in 1972).

From 1928 he was a professor in terrestrial magnetism and physical cosmology at Bergen Museum. He died in May 1934 in Fana. He was decorated with the Légion d'honneur and the Order of the Crown of Italy. In 1937 a stone monument to him was unveiled at Nesttun Church, and a road in Tromsø has been named after him.
