= St. Jonsfjorden =

Fjord in Svalbard, Norway

Coordinates: 78°31′25″N 12°45′40″E

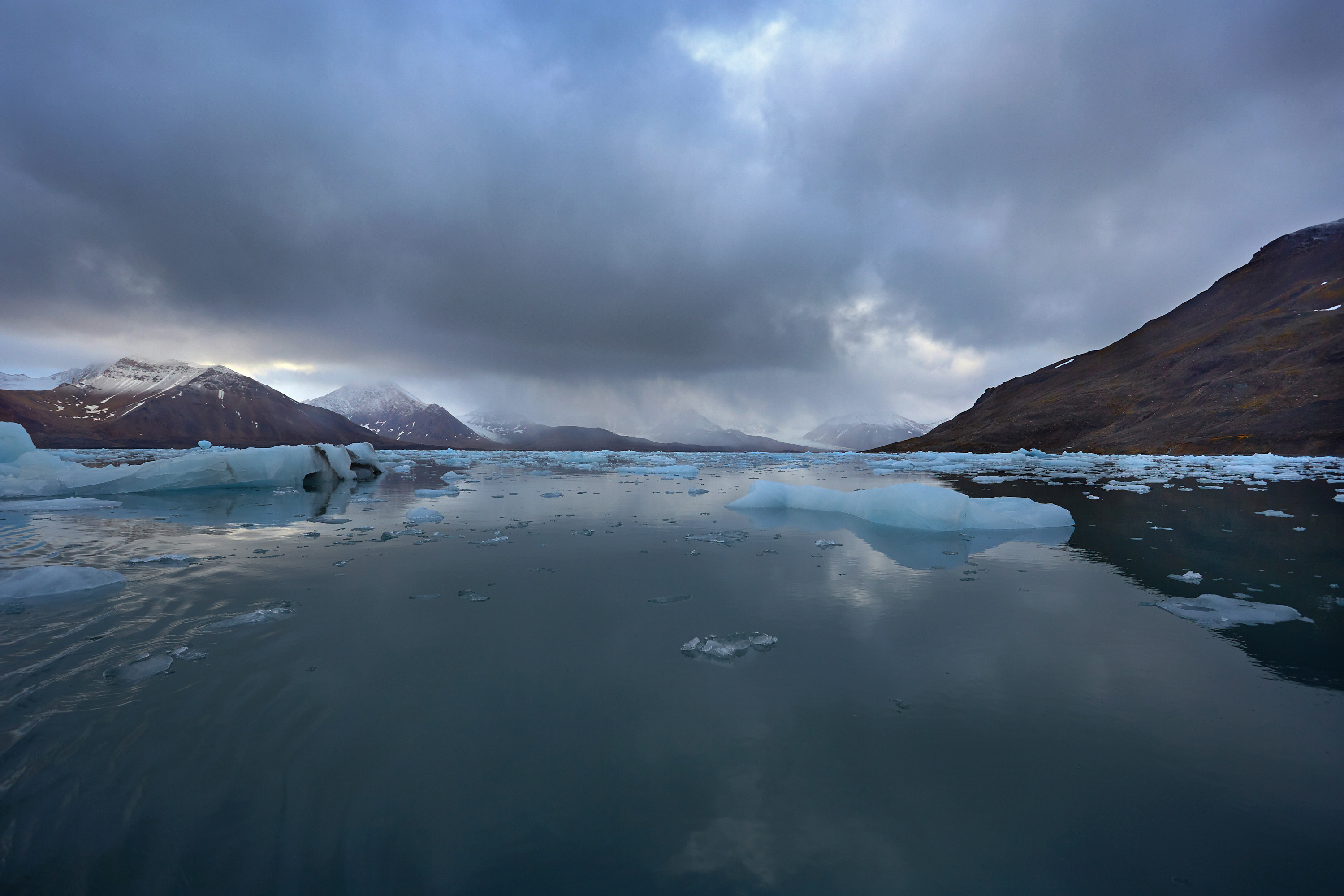

St. Jonsfjorden is a fjord in Oscar II Land at Spitsbergen, Svalbard. It has a length of 21 kilometer, and opens westwards into the strait of Forlandsundet. Several glaciers debouche into the fjord, including Gaffelbreen and Konowbreen from the north, a merge of Osbornebreen, Devikbreen, Vintervegen, Paulbreen and Bukkebreen at the bottom, and Vegardbreen, Charlesbreen and Bullbreen from the south.
