= History of whaling =

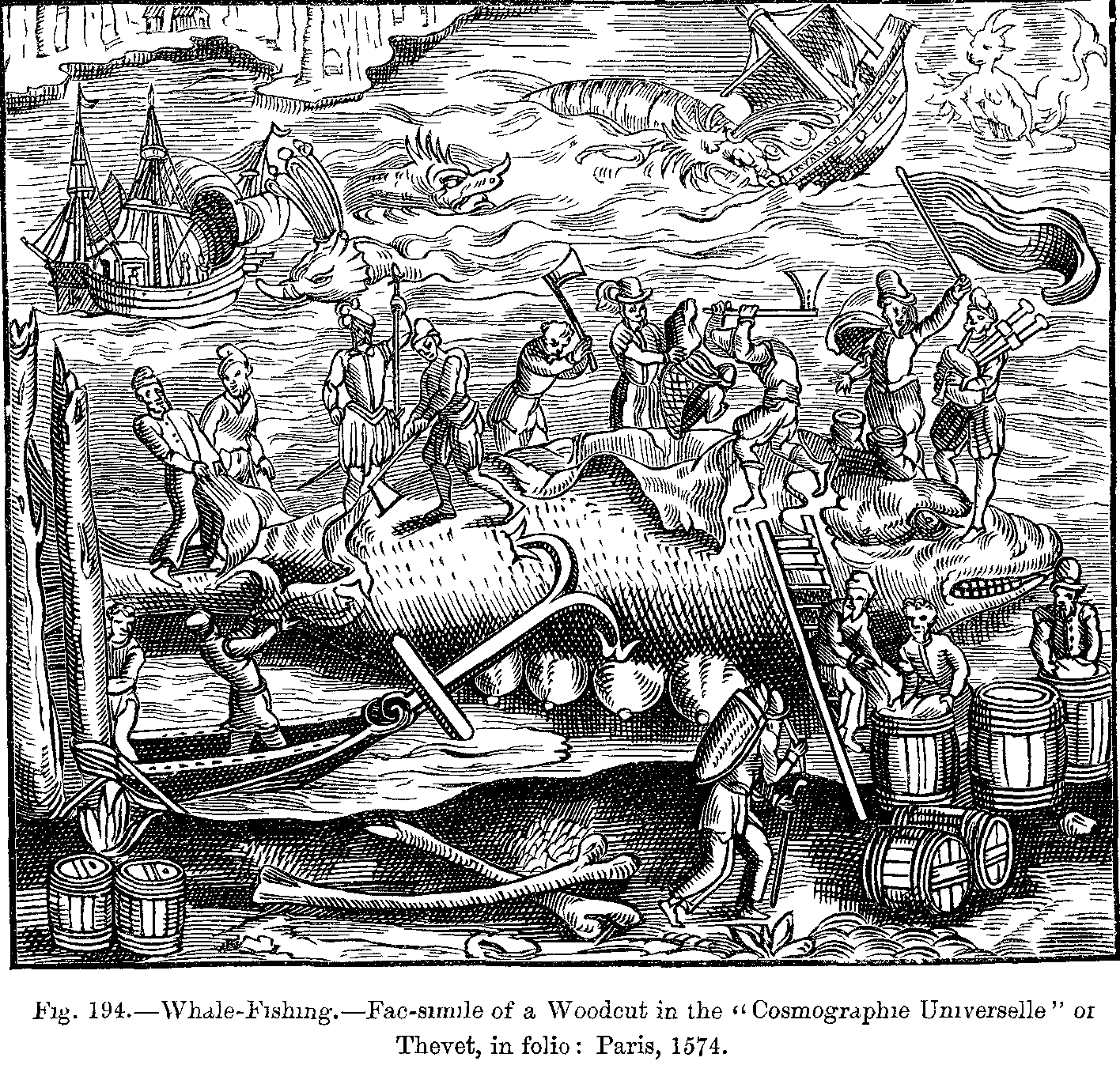
Whale-Fishing. Facsimile of a Woodcut in the "Cosmographie Universelle" of Thevet, in folio: Paris, 1574.

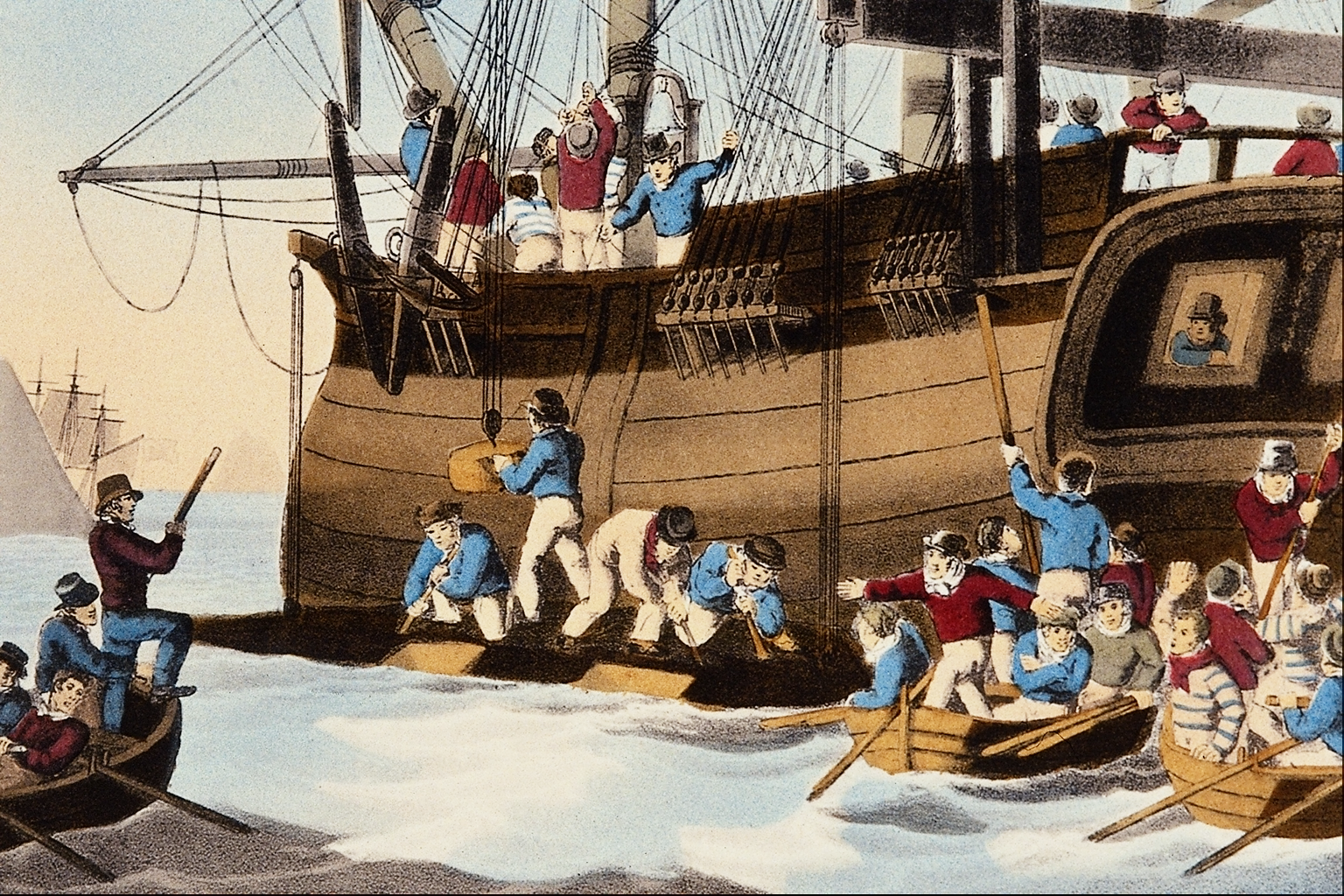
A Whale Brought alongside a Ship, by the Scottish John Heaviside Clark, 1814. Flensing is in process.

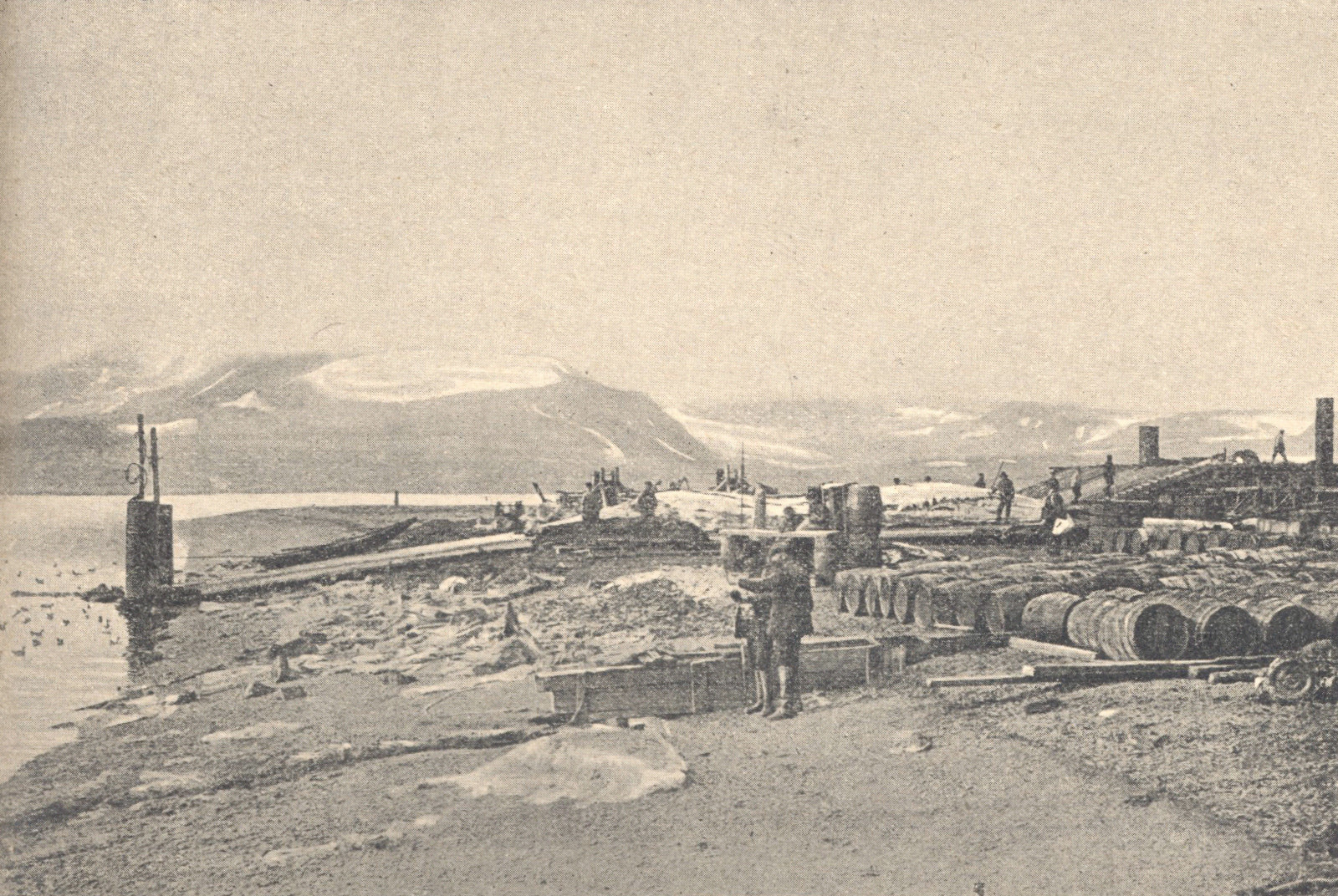
Photo of a whaling station in Spitsbergen, Norway, 1907

Whaling has been an important subsistence and economic activity in multiple regions throughout human history. Commercial whaling dramatically reduced in importance during the 19th century due to the development of alternatives to whale oil for lighting, and the collapse in whale populations. Despite the International Whaling Commission (IWC) moratorium on commercial whaling in 1986, some nations continue to hunt whales to today.

== Early history ==
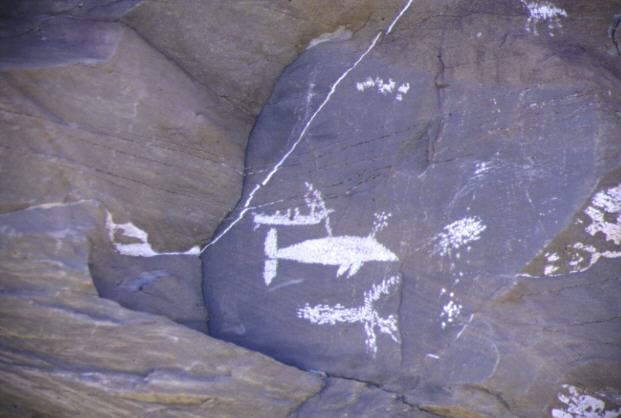
A whaling scene from the Pegtymel rock art site in Chukotka (less than 40 km from the Arctic Ocean)

Humans have engaged in whaling since prehistoric times. Early depictions of whaling at the Neolithic Bangudae site in Korea, inscribed on the World Heritage list, may date back to 6000 BCE. The University of Alaska Fairbanks has described evidence for whaling at least as early as circa 1000 BCE. According to archaeological evidence from a 2026 study, the earliest form of whaling targeting baleen whales dates back at least 5000 years ago (3000 BC) and was estimated to have been practiced by indigenous peoples in southern Brazil.

The oldest known method of catching cetaceans is dolphin drive hunting, in which a number of small boats are positioned between the animal and the open sea and the animals are herded towards shore in an attempt to beach them. This method is still used for smaller species such as pilot whales, beluga whales, porpoises and narwhals, as described in A Pattern of Islands, a memoir published by British administrator Arthur Grimble in 1952.

Another early method used a drogue (a semi-floating object) such as a wooden drum or an inflated sealskin tied to an arrow or a harpoon. Once the missile had been shot into a whale's body, the buoyancy and drag from the drogue would eventually cause the whale to tire, allowing it to be approached and killed. Cultures that practiced whaling with drogues included the Ainu, Inuit, Native Americans, and the Basque people of the Bay of Biscay. The Bangudae petroglyphs show sperm whales, humpback whales and North Pacific right whales surrounded by boats, and suggest that drogues, harpoons and lines were being used to kill small whales as early as 6000 BCE. Cetacean bones of the same period were also found in the area, reflecting the importance of whales in the diet of prehistoric coastal people.

Whale bones recovered near the Strait of Gibraltar raise the possibility that whales were hunted in the Mediterranean Sea by ancient Rome.

== Whaling history by region ==
=== North America ===
==== Newfoundland and Labrador ====
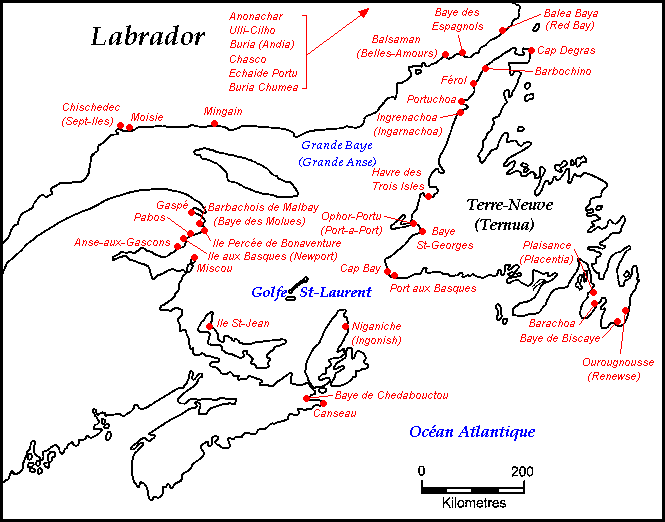
Basque settlements and sites dating from the 16th and 17th centuries

Around 1525 Basques began whaling and fishing for cod off Newfoundland, Labrador, and similar places. In his History of Brittany (1582), the French jurist and historian Bertrand d'Argentré made the claim that the Basques, Bretons, and Normans were the first to reach the New World "before any other people". The Bordeaux jurist Etienne de Cleirac (1647) made a similar claim, stating that the French Basques, in pursuing whales across the North Atlantic, discovered North America a century before Columbus. The Belgian cetologist Pierre-Joseph van Beneden (1878, 1892) repeated such assertions by saying that the Basques, in the year 1372, (Note: Van Beneden may have erred on the date. He may have meant 1392. In this way he would simply be repeating Cleirac's earlier claim.) found the number of whales to increase on approach of the Newfoundland Banks.

The first undisputed presence of Basque whaling expeditions in the New World was in the second quarter of the 16th century. It appears to have been the French Basques, following the lead of Breton cod-fishermen that reported finding rich whaling grounds in Terranova (Newfoundland). The Basques called the area they frequented Grandbaya (Grand Bay), today known as the Strait of Belle Isle, which separates Newfoundland from southern Labrador. Their initial voyages to this area were mixed cod and whaling ventures. Instead of returning home with whale oil, they brought back whale meat in brine. The French Basque ship La Catherine d'Urtubie made the first known voyage involving whale products in 1530, when she supposedly returned with 4,500 dried and cured cod, as well as twelve barrels of whale meat "without flippers or tail" (a phrase for whale meat in brine). After a period of development, expeditions were sent purely aimed at obtaining whale oil. The first establishments for processing whale oil in southern Labrador may have been built in the late 1530s, although it wasn't until 1548 that notarial documents confirm this.

By the 1540s, when the Spanish Basques began sending whaling expeditions to Newfoundland, the ventures were no longer experimental, but a "resounding financial success from their inception." By the end of the decade they were delivering large cargoes of whale oil to Bristol, London, and Flanders. A large market existed for "lumera", as whale oil used for lighting was called. "Sain" or "grasa de ballena" was also used (by mixing it with tar and oakum) for caulking ships, as well as in the textile industry. Ambroise Paré (1510–90), who visited Bayonne when King Charles IX (r. 1560–74) was there in 1564, said they used the baleen to "make farthingales, stays for women, knife-handles, and many other things".

Most documents dealing with whaling in Newfoundland concern the years 1548 to 1588, with the largest quantity dealing with the harbor of Red Bay or "Less Buttes"—both names in reference to the red granite cliffs of the region. The references include acts of piracy in the 1550s, the loss of a ship in 1565, a disastrous wintering in 1576–77, and, on Christmas Eve 1584, a will written for a dying Basque, Joanes de Echaniz; the first known Canadian will. The last overwintering in Red Bay was made in 1603. During their onshore stays, the whalers developed relations with North American natives that led to the establishment of a purpose-specific language with both American native and Basque elements.

==== United States of America ====
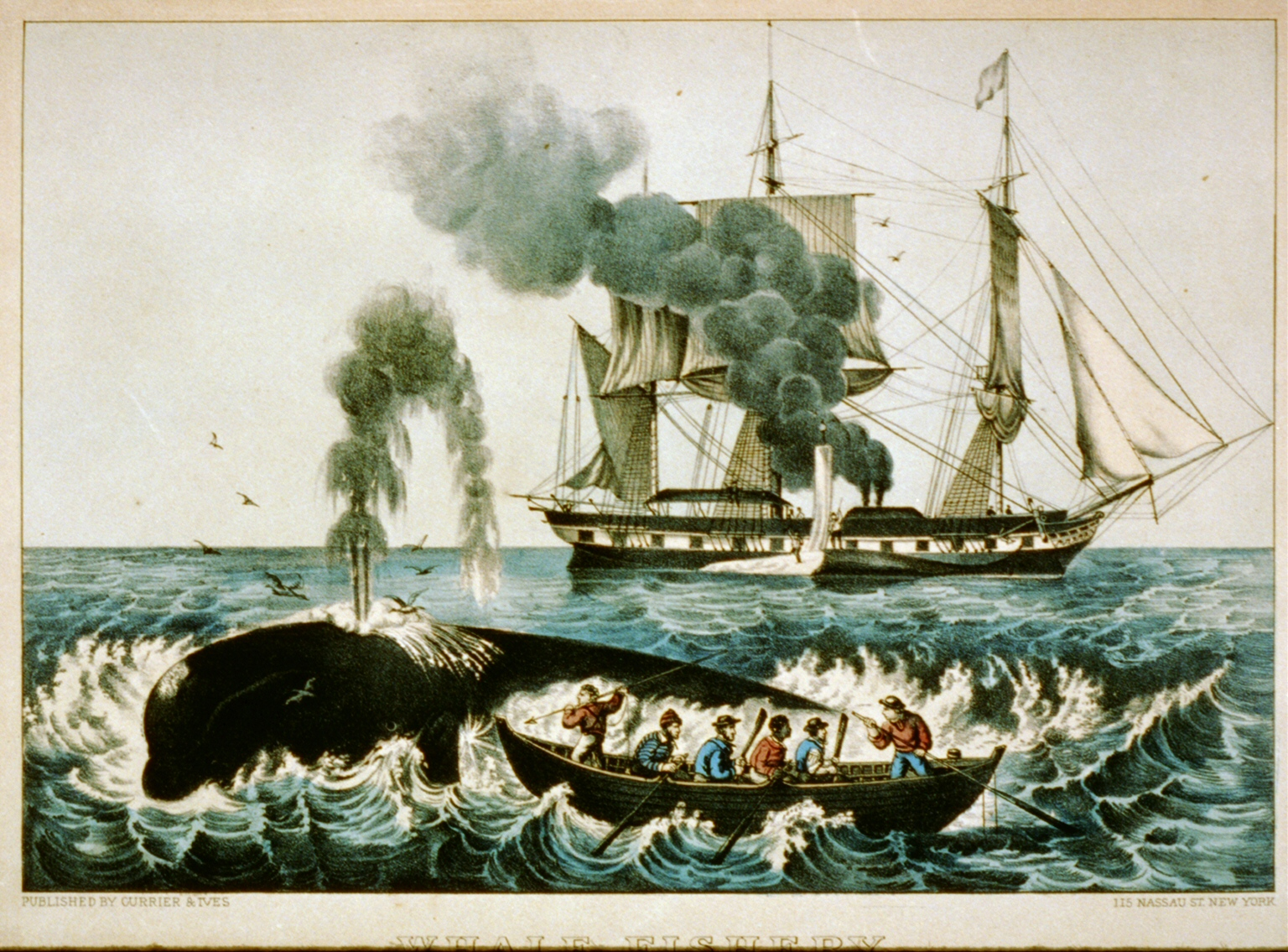
Whale Fishery – Attacking a Right Whale, New England whaling c. 1860

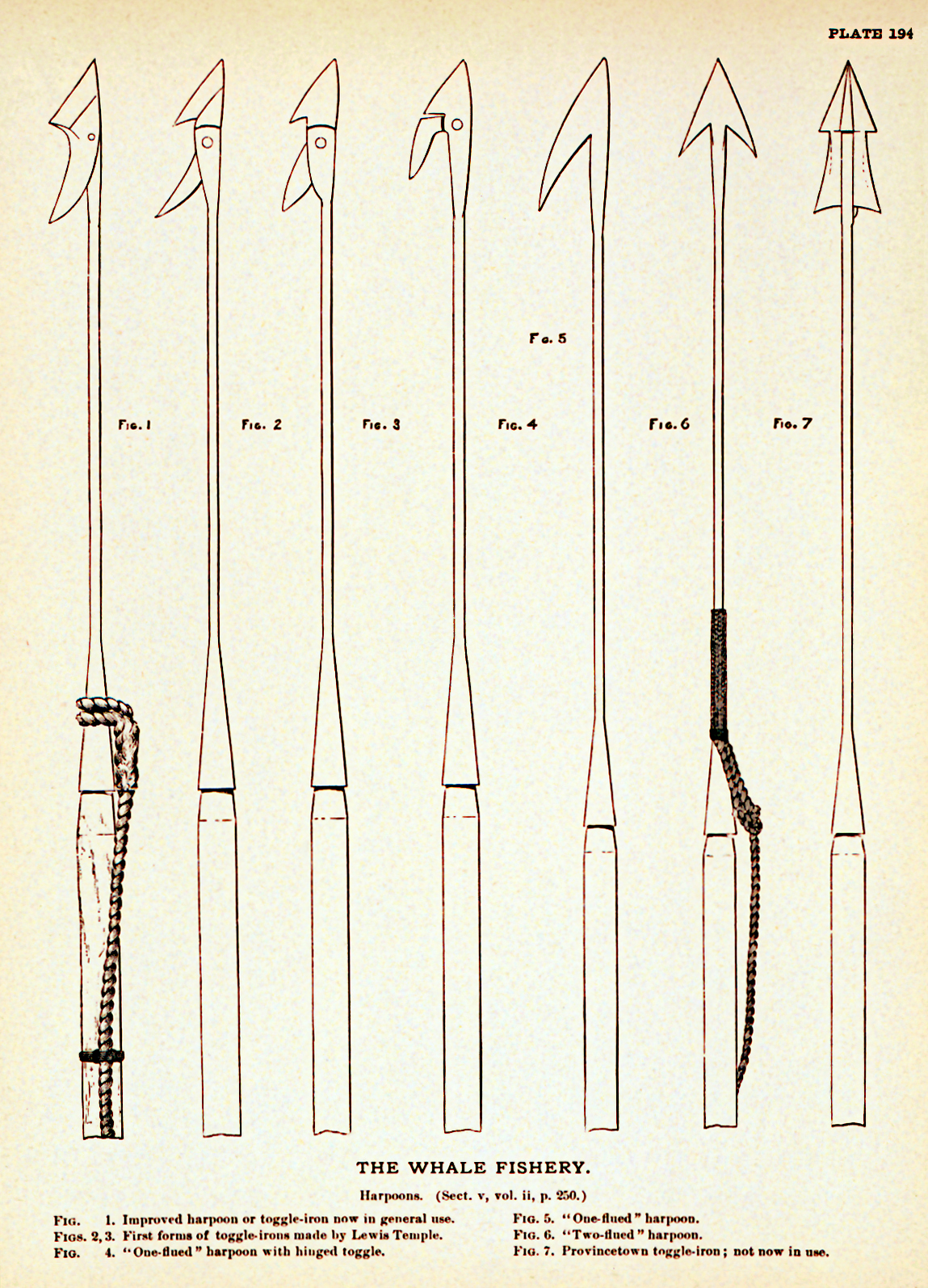
Assortment of whaling harpoons, 1887

Beginning in the late colonial period, the United States grew to become the preeminent whaling nation in the world by the 1830s. American whaling's origins were in New York and New England, including Cape Cod, Massachusetts and nearby cities. Whale oil was in demand chiefly for lamps. By the 18th century whaling in Nantucket had become a highly lucrative deep-sea industry, with voyages extending for years at a time and traveling as far as South Pacific waters. During the American Revolution, the British navy targeted American whaling ships as legitimate prizes. In turn, many whalers fitted out as privateers against the British.

Whaling recovered after the war ended in 1783 and the industry began to prosper, using bases at Nantucket and then New Bedford. Whalers took greater economic risks in search of profit, expanding their hunting grounds. Investment and financing arrangements allowed managers of whaling ventures to share their risks by selling some equity, but retain a substantial portion of the profit. As a result, they had little incentive to plan their voyages to minimize risk.

Ten thousand seamen manned the ships, including more than 3,000 African American seamen. Early whaling efforts concentrated on right whales and humpbacks, which were found near the American coast. As these populations declined and the market for whale products grew, American whalers began hunting sperm whales. The sperm whale was particularly prized for spermaceti, a dense waxy substance that burns with an exceedingly bright flame that is found in the spermaceti organ, located forward and above the skull. (In fact, the measurement of luminosity, or light, is called Candlepower, and its very definition is measured as the light put out by a spermaceti candle.)

Hunting sperm whales required longer whaling voyages, and soon New Bedford and Nantucket whalemen were ranging the globe, cruising "whaling grounds" off Japan, off the coast of Peru and Ecuador, and along the equatorial regions of the Pacific Ocean.

Whale oil was essential for illuminating homes and businesses in the 19th century, and lubricated the machines of the Industrial Revolution. Manufacturers in the United States and Europe prized the long keratin plates (called baleen) found in the mouths of whale species like the right whale and the humpback whale. Baleen whales used these fringed plates as a sort of "sieve" to strain small food items out of the water. For humans, the baleen went to work in the form of corset stays and umbrella ribs and the like.

British competition and import duties drove New England whaling ships out of the North Atlantic and into the southern oceans, ultimately making whaling into a global economic enterprise. The mid 19th century was the golden age of American whaling.

From the Civil War, when Confederate raiders targeted American whalers, through the early 20th century, the American whaling industry suffered economic competition, especially from kerosene, a superior fuel for lighting.

===== Localities =====
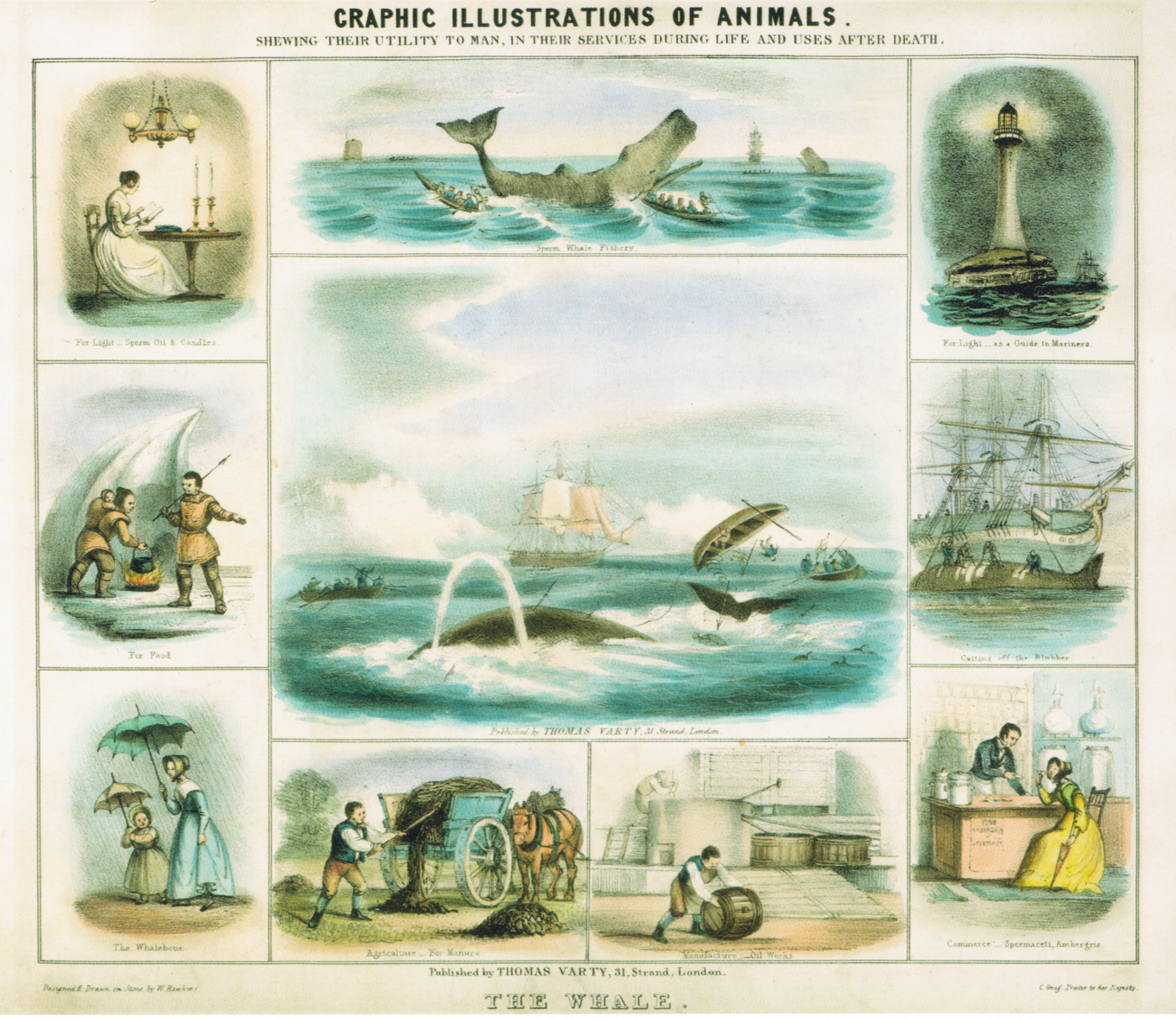
"The whale and its products", c. 1900

A number of New England towns were heavily involved in whaling, particularly Nantucket and New Bedford. Nantucket began whaling in 1690 after recruiting a whaling instructor, Ichabod Paddock. The south side of the island was divided into three and a half mile sections, each with a mast erected to look for the spouts of right whales. Once a whale was sighted, rowing boats were sent from the shore. If the whale was successfully killed it was towed ashore, flensed (i.e., the blubber was cut off), and the blubber boiled in cauldrons known as "try pots". Even when whales were caught far offshore, the blubber was still boiled on shore well into the 18th century. New Bedford whaling was established when prominent Nantucket whaling families moved their operations to the town for economic reasons, and made New Bedford the fourth busiest port in the United States. In Herman Melville's novel Moby-Dick the narrator passes through New Bedford before beginning his whaling voyage from Nantucket.

In the late 1870s, schooners began hunting humpbacks in the Gulf of Maine. In 1880, with the decline of menhaden fish, steamers began to switch to hunting fin and humpback whales using bomb lances. This has been called "shoot-and-salvage" because of the high-rate of loss due to whales sinking, lines breaking, etc. The first such whale hunting ship was the steamer Mabel Bird, which towed whale carcasses to an oil processing plant in Boothbay Harbor. At its height in 1885 four or five steamers were engaged in whale fishery at Boothbay Harbour, dwindling to one by the end of the decade. Over 100 whales were killed annually during some years. The fishery ended in the late 1890s.

===== Technological advancement =====
In the 1850s, the Euro–American whalemen began a serious attempt at catching rorquals such as the blue whale and fin whale. In the 1860s Captain Thomas Welcome Roys invented a rocket harpoon, making a significant contribution to the development of the California whaling industry. In 1877, John Nelson Fletcher, a pyrotechnist, and a former Confederate soldier, Robert L. Suits, modified Roys' rocket, marketing it as the "California Whaling Rocket". The rocket was highly effective in killing whales.

Danish naval officer Captain Otto C. Hammer and the Dutchman Captain C. J. Bottemanne also imitated Roys' rocket harpoon. Hammer formed the Danish Fishing Company, which operated from 1865 to 1871. Bottemanne formed the Netherlands Whaling Company, which operated from 1869 to 1872.

===== Legacy =====
In 1996, the New Bedford Whaling National Historical Park was established, offering exhibits on the history of the "City that Lit the World".

==== Pacific Northwest ====
Whaling on the Pacific Northwest Coast encompassed both aboriginal and commercial whaling. The indigenous peoples of this coast have whaling traditions dating back millennia. A memoir by John R. Jewitt, an English blacksmith who spent three years as a captive of the Nuu-chah-nulth people from 1802 to 1805, makes clear the importance of whale meat and oil to their diet. Whaling was integral to the cultures and economies of other indigenous people as well, notably the Makah and Klallam. For other groups, especially the Haida, whales appear prominently as totems.

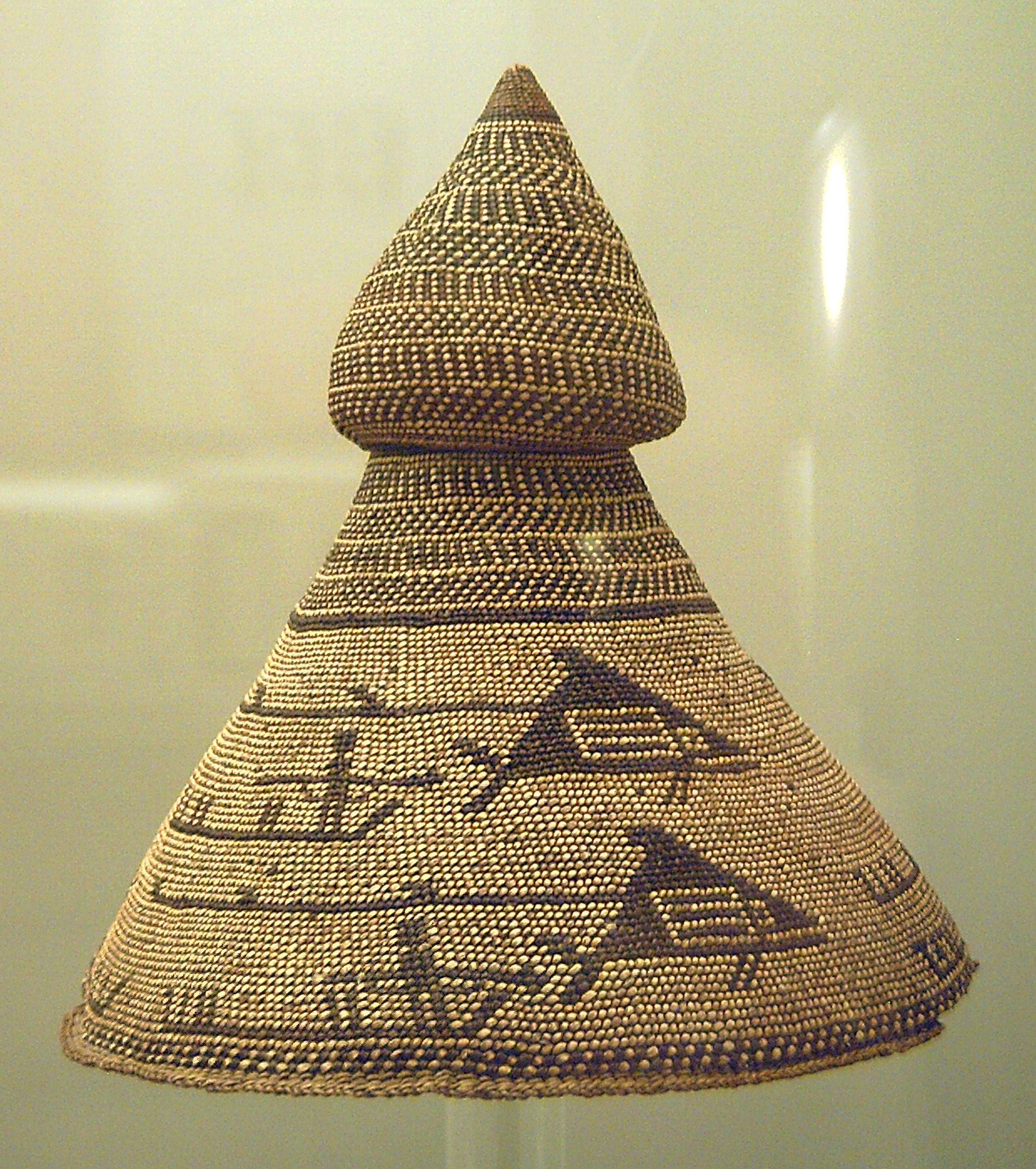
18th-century Nuu-chah-nulth whaler hat, Canada.

Hunting of cetaceans continues by Alaska Natives (mainly beluga and narwhal, plus subsistence hunting of the bowhead whale) and to a lesser extent by the Makah (gray whale). Commercial whaling in British Columbia and southeast Alaska ended in the late 1960s.

=== Bering Strait ===
In the 1840s, large numbers of bowhead whale were discovered around the Bering Strait. In 1848, American whaler Thomas Welcome Roys returned with a significant catch which drew the industry's attention. More than 500 whales were caught the following year and more than 2,000 in 1850. The whaling boom drew more than 220 ships in 1852 but it collapsed almost as soon as it began, with catches severely diminishing in 1853.

=== Basque Country (Spain and France) ===
The first mention of Basque whaling was made in 1059, when it was said to have been practiced at the Basque town of Bayonne. The fishery spread to what is now the Spanish Basque Country in 1150, when King Sancho the Wise of Navarre granted petitions for the warehousing of such commodities as whalebone (baleen). At first, they hunted the North Atlantic right whale, using watchtowers (known as vigias) to look for their distinctive twin vapor spouts.

By the 14th century, Basque whalers were making "seasonal trips" to the English Channel and southern Ireland. The fishery spread to Terranova (Labrador and Newfoundland) in the second quarter of the 16th century, and to Iceland by the early 17th century. They established whaling stations in Terranova, mainly in Red Bay, and hunted bowheads as well as right whales.

The fishery in Terranova declined for a variety of reasons, including the conflicts between Spain and other European powers during the late 16th and early 17th centuries, attacks by hostile Inuit, declining whale populations, and perhaps the opening up of the Spitsbergen fishery in 1611.

The first voyages to Spitsbergen by the English, Dutch, and Danish relied on Basque specialists, with the Basque provinces sending out their own whaler in 1612. The following season San Sebastián and Saint-Jean-de-Luz sent out a combined eleven or twelve whalers to the Spitsbergen fishery, but most were driven off by the Dutch and English. Two more ships were sent by a merchant in San Sebastián in 1615, but both were driven away by the Dutch. Conflict over the Spitsbergen whaling grounds between the English, French, Dutch and Danish continued until 1638.

Whale fishing in Iceland and Spitsbergen continued at least into the 18th century, but Basque whaling in those regions appears to have ended in 1756 at the beginning of the Seven Years' War.

=== Greenland and Spitsbergen ===
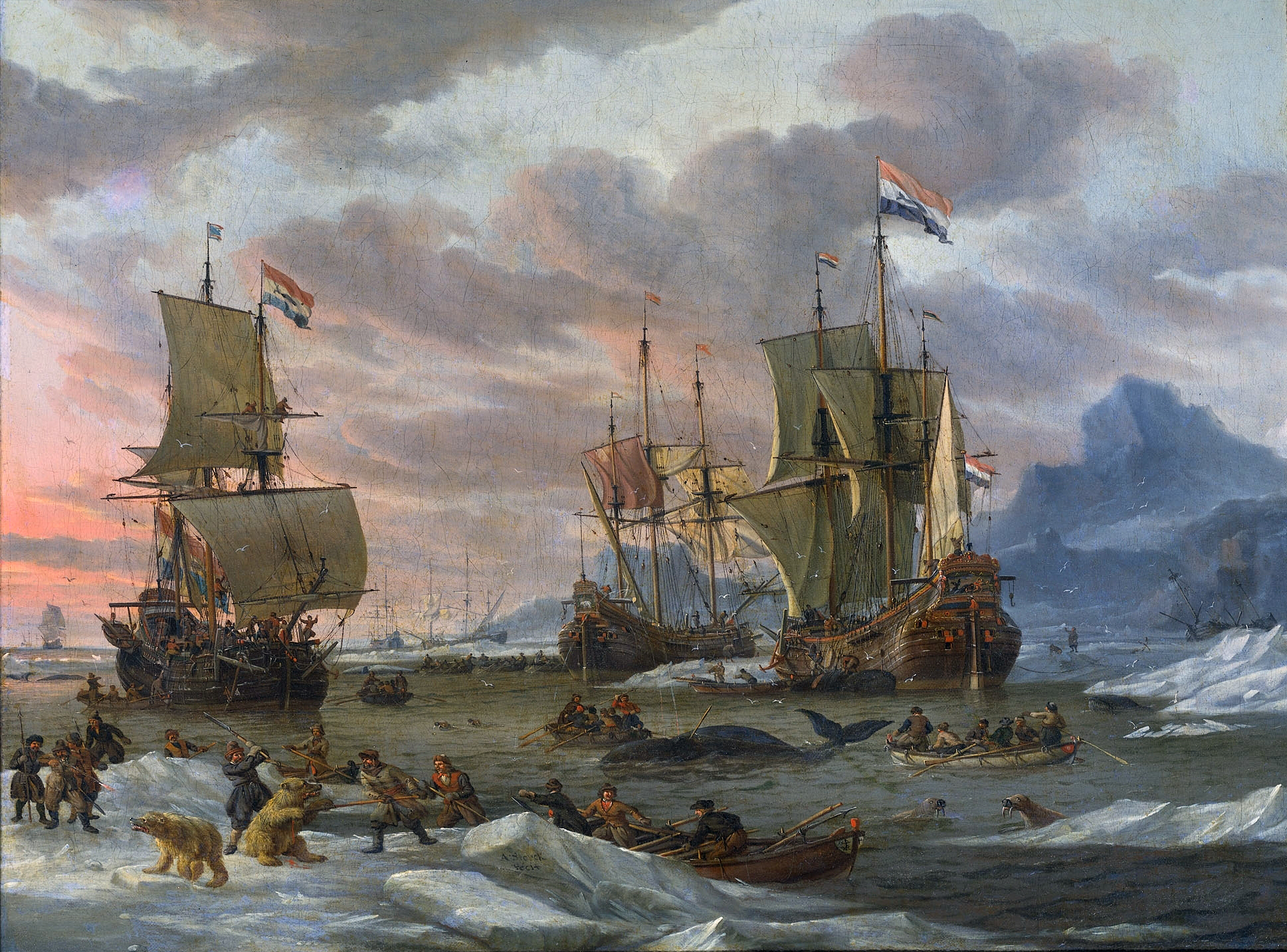
Whaling, by Abraham Storck

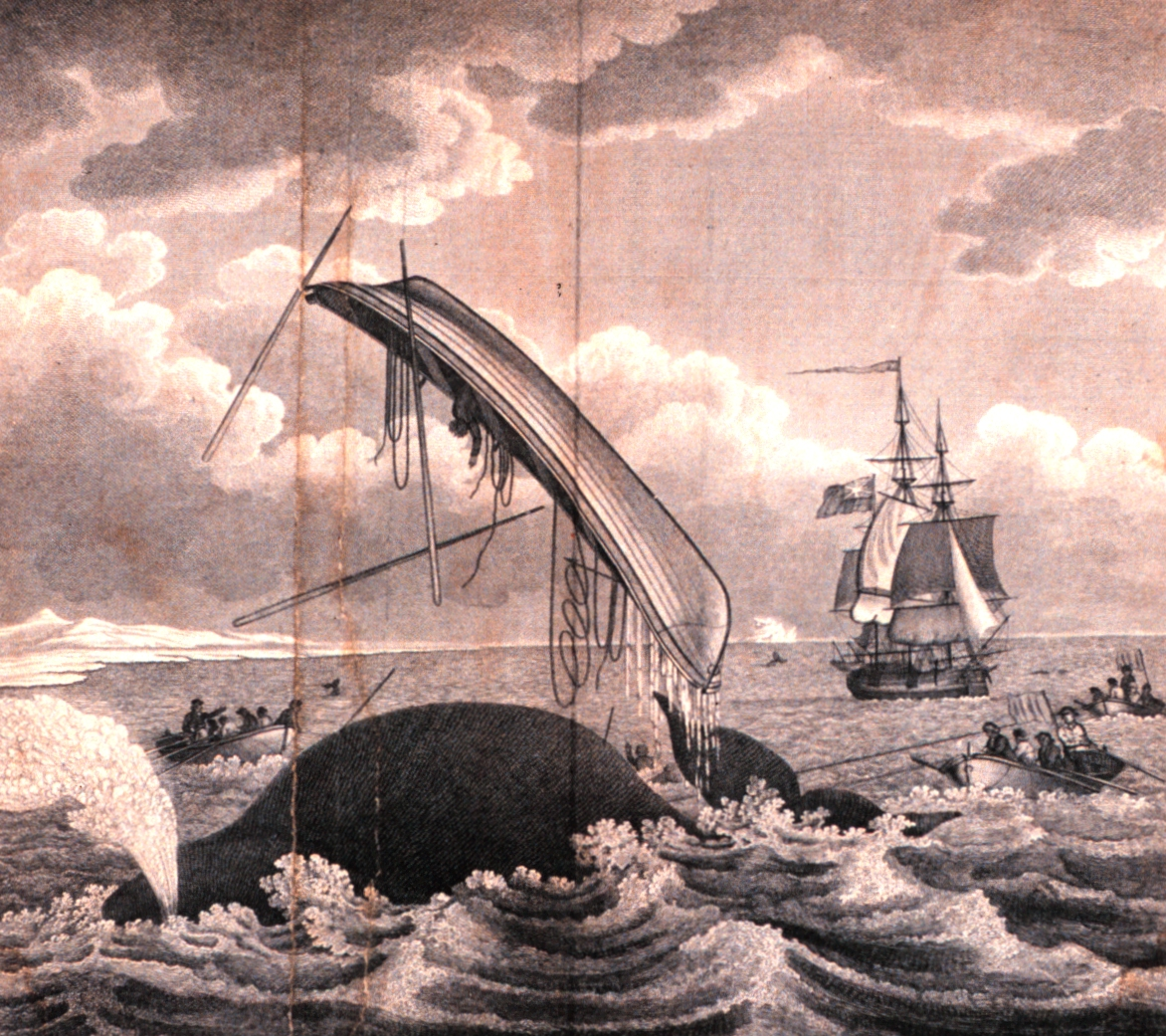
Dangers of the Whale Fishery, by W. Scoresby, 1820

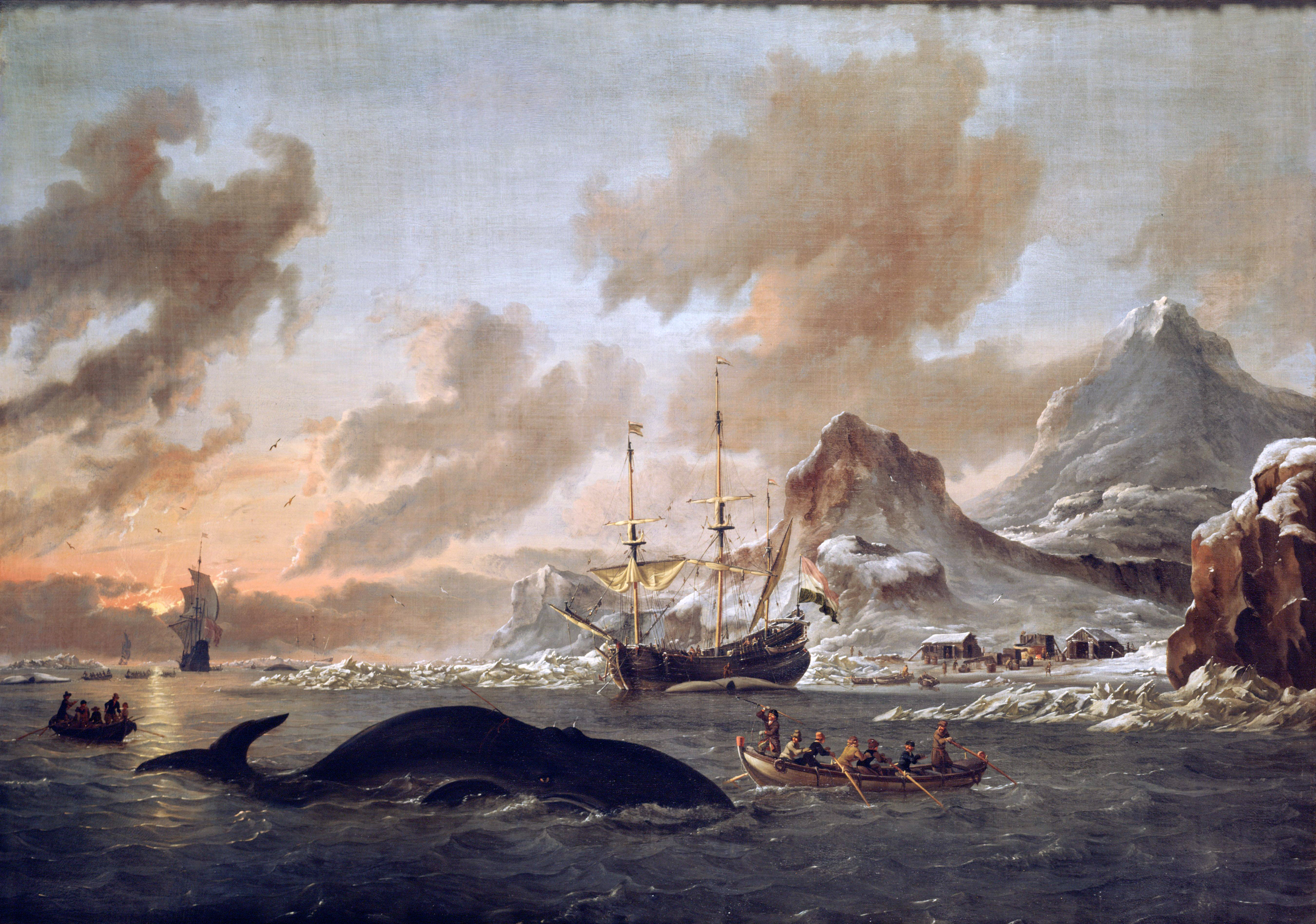
Whaling off the Coast of Spitsbergen, by Abraham Storck

Encouraged by reports of whales off the coast of Spitsbergen, Norway, in 1610, the English Muscovy Company (also known as the Russian Company) sent a whaling expedition there the following year. The expedition was a disaster, with both ships sent being lost. The crews returned to England in a ship from Hull. The following year two more ships were sent. Other countries followed suit, with Amsterdam and San Sebastián each sending a ship north. The latter ship returned to Spain with a full cargo of oil. Such a fabulous return resulted in a fleet of whaleships being sent to Spitsbergen in 1613. The Muscovy Company sent seven, backed by a monopoly charter granted by King James I. They met with twenty other whaleships (eleven or twelve Basque, five French, and three Dutch), as well as a London interloper, which were either ordered away or forced to pay a fine of some sort. The United Provinces, France, and Spain all protested against this treatment, but James I held fast to his claim of sovereignty over Spitsbergen.

The following three and a half decades witnessed numerous clashes between the various nations (as well as infighting among the English), often merely posturing, but sometimes resulting in bloodshed. This jealousy stemmed as much from the mechanics of early whaling as from straightforward international animosities. In the first years of the fishery England, France, the United Provinces and later Denmark–Norway shipped expert Basque whalemen for their expeditions. At the time Basque whaling relied on the utilization of stations ashore where blubber could be processed into oil. In order to allow a rapid transference of this technique to Spitsbergen, suitable anchorages had to be selected, of which there were only a limited number, in particular on the west coast of the island.

Early in 1614, the Dutch formed the Noordsche Compagnie (Northern Company), a cartel composed of several independent chambers (each representing a particular port). The company sent fourteen ships supported by three or four men-of-war this year, while the English sent a fleet of thirteen ships and pinnaces. Equally matched, they agreed to split the coast between themselves, to the exclusion of third parties. The English received the four principal harbors in the middle of the west coast, while the Dutch could settle anywhere to the south or north. The agreement explicitly stated that it was only meant to last for this season.

In 1615 the Dutch arrived with a fleet of eleven ships and three men-of-war under Adriaen Block, occupied Fairhaven, Bell Sound, and Horn Sound by force, and built the first permanent structure on Spitsbergen: a wooden hut to store their equipment in. The ten ships sent by the Muscovy Company were relegated to the south side of Fairhaven, Sir Thomas Smith's Bay, and Ice Sound. The Danes meanwhile sent a fleet of five sail under Gabriel Kruse to demand a toll from the foreign whalers and in doing so assert Christian IV's claim of sovereignty over the region, but both the English and Dutch rebuffed his efforts—two ships from Bordeaux chartered by a merchant in San Sebastián were also sent away by the Dutch. The following year, 1616, the English, with a fleet of ten ships, occupied all the major harbors, appropriated the Dutch hut, and made a rich haul, while the Dutch, preoccupied with Jan Mayen, only sent four ships to Spitsbergen, which "kept together in odd places... and made a poor voyage."

In 1617 a ship from Vlissingen whaling in Horn Sound had its cargo seized by the English vice-admiral. Angry, the following season the Dutch sent nearly two dozen ships to Spitsbergen. Five of the fleet attacked two English ships, killing three men in the process, and also burned down the English station in Horn Sound. Negotiations between the two nations followed in 1619, with James I, while still claiming sovereignty, would not enforce it for the following three seasons. When this concession expired, the English twice (in 1623 and 1624) tried to expel the Dutch from Spitsbergen, failing both times.

In 1619 the Dutch and Danes, who had sent their first whaling expedition to Spitsbergen in 1617, firmly settled themselves on Amsterdam Island, a small island on the northwestern tip of Spitsbergen; while the English did the same in the fjords to the south. The Danish–Dutch settlement came to be called Smeerenburg, which would become the centre of operations for the latter in the first decades of the fishery. Numerous place names attest to the various nations' presence, including Copenhagen Bay (Kobbefjorden) and Danes Island (Danskøya), where the Danes established a station from 1631 to 1658; Port Louis or Refuge Français (Hamburgbukta), where the French had a station from 1633 to 1638, until they were driven away by the Danes (see below); and finally English Bay (Engelskbukta), as well as the number of features named by English whalemen and explorers—for example, Isfjorden, Bellsund, and Hornsund, to name a few.

Hostilities continued after 1619. In 1626 nine ships from Hull and York destroyed the Muscovy Company's fort and station in Bell Sound, and sailed to their own in Midterhukhamna. Here they were found by the heavily armed flagship of the London whaling fleet; a two-hour battle ensued, resulting in defeat for the Hull and York fleet and their expulsion from Spitsbergen. In 1630 both the ships of Hull and Great Yarmouth, who had recently joined the trade, were driven away clean (empty) by the ships from London. From 1631 to 1633, the Danes, French, and Dutch quarreled with each other, resulting in the expulsion of the Danes from Smeerenburg and the French from Copenhagen Bay. In 1634 the Dutch burned down one of the Danes' huts. There were also two battles this season, one between the English and French (the latter won) and the other between London and Yarmouth (the latter won, as well). In 1637 and again in 1638 the Danes drove the French out of Port Louis and seized their cargoes. In the former year they also seized a French ship in the open sea and detained it in Copenhagen Bay, while in the latter year they also held two Dutch ships captive in the same bay for over a month, which led to protests from the Dutch. Following the events of 1638 hostilities, for the most part, ceased, with the exception of a few minor incidents in the 1640s between the French and Danes, as well as between Copenhagen and Hamburg and London and Yarmouth, respectively.

The species hunted was the bowhead whale, a baleen whale that yielded large quantities of oil and baleen. The whales entered the fjords in the spring following the breakup of the ice. They were spotted by the whalemen from suitable vantage points, and pursued by shallops, chaloupes or chalupas, which were manned by six men. (These terms derive from the Basque word "txalupa", used to name the whaling boats that were widely utilized during the golden era of Basque whaling in Labrador in the 16th century.) The whale was harpooned and lanced to death and either towed to the stern of the ship or to the shore at low tide, where men with long knives would flense (cut up) the blubber. The blubber was boiled in large copper kettles and cooled in large wooden vessels, after which it was funneled into casks. The stations at first only consisted of tents of sail and crude furnaces, but were soon replaced by more permanent structures of wood and brick, such as Smeerenburg for the Dutch, Lægerneset for the English, and Copenhagen Bay for the Danes.

Beginning in the 1630s, for the Dutch at least, whaling expanded into the open sea. Gradually whaling in the open sea and along the ice floes to the west of Spitsbergen replaced bay whaling. At first, the blubber was tried out at the end of the season at Smeerenburg or elsewhere along the coast, but after mid-century the stations were abandoned entirely in favor of processing the blubber upon the return of the ship to port. The English meanwhile stuck resolutely to bay whaling, and didn't make the transfer to pelagic (offshore) whaling until long after. In 1719, the Dutch began "regular and intensive whaling" in the Davis Strait, between Greenland and Canada's Baffin Island. The British South Sea Company financed 172 whaling voyages to Greenland from London's Howland Dock between 1725 and 1732. Beginning in 1733, the British Government offered a 'bounty' for whale oil, leading to further expansion. However, due to reductions in the bounty and wars with America and France, London's Greenland fleet fell to 19 in 1796.

During the 17th and 18th century North Frisian Islanders had a reputation of being very skilled mariners, and most Dutch and English whaling ships bound for Greenland and Svalbard would recruit their crew from these islands. Around the year 1700, Föhr island had a total population of roughly 6,000, of whom 1,600 were whalers. In 1762, 25% of all shipmasters on Dutch whaling vessels were people from Föhr, and the South Sea Company's commanding officers and harpooners were exclusively from Föhr. Sylt island and Borkum island were also notable homes of whaling personnel.

The British would continue to send out whalers to the Arctic fishery into the 20th century, sending their last on the eve of the First World War.

=== Japan ===
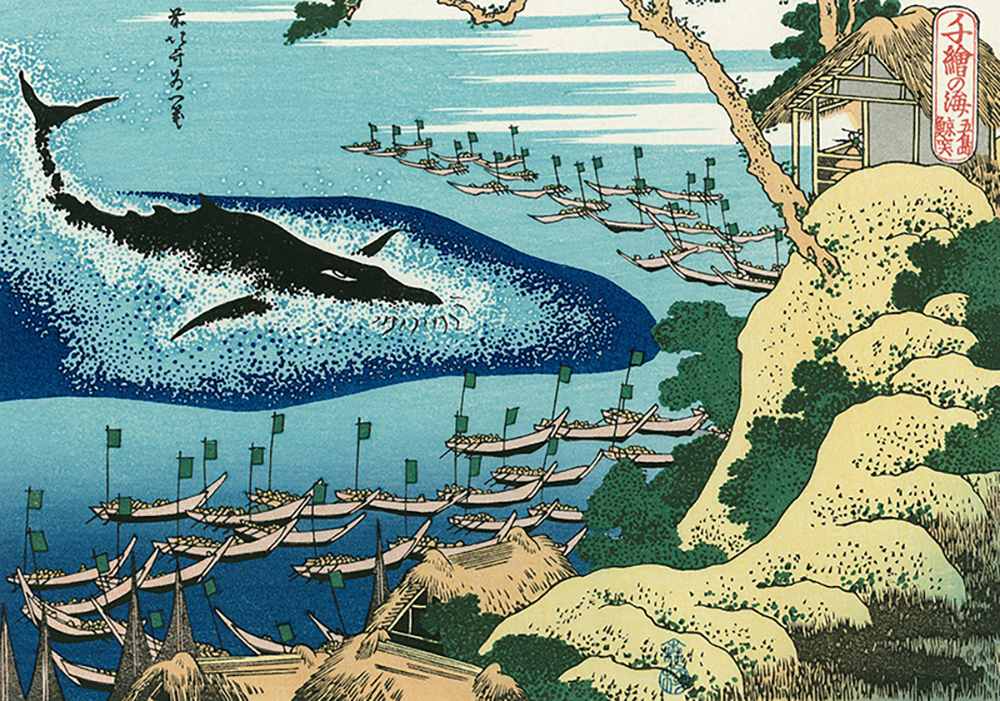
Whaling Scene on the Coast of Gotō, an ukiyo-e print by Hokusai, c. 1830

The oldest written mention of whaling in Japanese records is from Kojiki, the oldest Japanese historical book, which was written in the 7th century CE. This book describes whale meat being eaten by Emperor Jimmu. In Man'yōshū, an anthology of poems from the 8th century CE, the word "Whaling" (いさなとり) was frequently used in depicting the ocean or beaches.

One of the first records of whaling using harpoons is from the 1570s at Morosaki, a bay attached to Ise Bay. This method of whaling spread to Kii (before 1606), Shikoku (1624), northern Kyushu (1630s), and Nagato (around 1672).

Kakuemon Wada, later known as Kakuemon Taiji, was said to have invented net whaling sometime between 1675 and 1677. This method soon spread to Shikoku (1681) and northern Kyushu (1684)

Using the techniques developed by Taiji, the Japanese mainly hunted four species of whale: the North Pacific right, the humpback, the fin, and the gray whale. They also caught the occasional blue, sperm, or sei/Bryde's whale .

In 1853, the US naval officer Matthew Perry forced Japan to open up to foreign trade. One purpose of his mission was to gain access to ports for the American whaling fleet in the north-west Pacific Ocean. Japan's traditional whaling was eventually replaced in the late 19th century and early 20th century with modern methods.

=== Britain ===
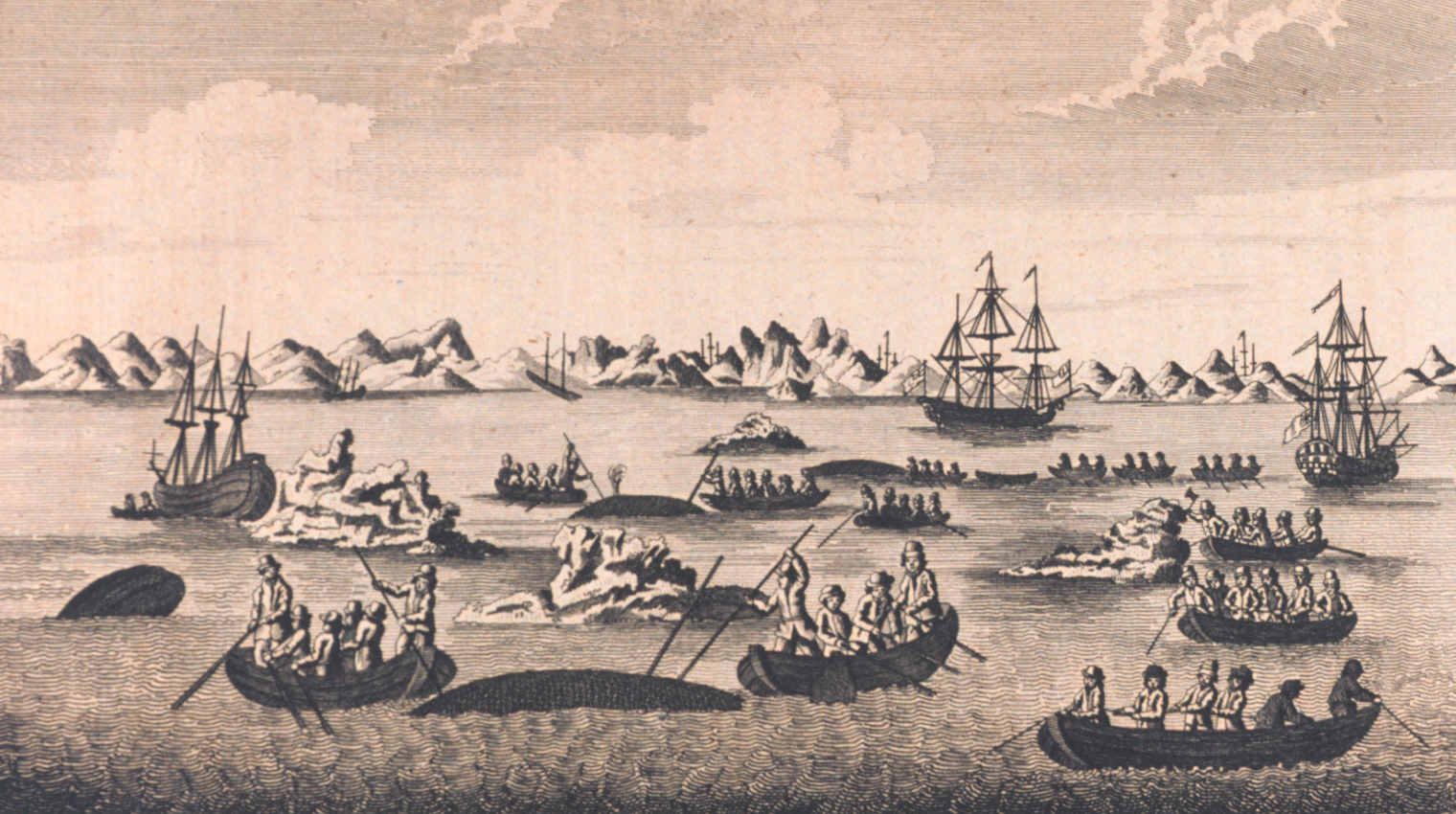
A View of Whale Fishery, 1790, from Captain Cook's voyages

Britain's involvement in whaling extended from 1611 to the 1960s and had three phases. The Northern (or Arctic) whale fishery lasted from 1611 to 1914 and involved whaling primarily off Greenland, and particularly the Davis Strait. The Southern (or South Seas) whale fishery was active from 1775 to 1859 and involved whale hunting first in the South Atlantic, then in the Indian and Pacific Oceans. British law defined and differentiated the two trades. Finally, modern British involvement in whaling extended from 1904 to 1963. Each of these three trades involved different species of whales as targets.

==== Northern whale fishery ====
From 1753 to 1837 whalers from Whitby were active in the Davis Strait. In 1832 the Phoenix was the only vessel to go out, returning with a record 234 tons of oil. The owners of the Phoenix, the Chapmans, therefore sent out two ships in 1833, the Camden and the Phoenix. Both vessels returned with large volumes of oil, but the price of whale oil and whalebone had fallen. After unsuccessful voyages in 1837 both ships were withdrawn from whaling, ending whaling from Whitby.

==== Southern whale fishery ====
The Southern fishery was launched when Samuel Enderby, along with Alexander Champion and John St Barbe, using American vessels and crews, sent out twelve whaleships in 1776. In 1786, the Triumph was the first British whaler to be sent east of the Cape of Good Hope, and in 1788, the whaler Emilia was sent west around Cape Horn into the Pacific Ocean to become the first ship of any nation to conduct whaling operations in the Southern Ocean. Emilia returned to London in 1790 with a cargo of 139 tons of whale oil. The first sperm whale killed in the Southern fishery was taken off the coast of Chile on 3 March 1789.

In 1784 the British had 15 whaleships in the southern fishery, all from London. Between 1793 and 1799 there was an average of 60 vessels in the trade, increasing to 72 in 1800–1809. The first sperm whale off the coast of New South Wales, Australia, was taken by the ship Britannia (Commander Thomas Melvill) in October 1791.

In 1819 the British whaler Syren, under Frederick Coffin of Nantucket, sailed to the coastal waters of Japan. She returned to London on 21 April 1822, with 346 tons of whale oil. By 1825 the British had 24 vessels there.

The number of vessels being fitted out annually for the southern fishery declined from 68 in 1820 to 31 in 1824. In 1825, there were 90 ships in the southern fishery, but by 1835 it had dwindled to 61 and by 1843 only 9 vessels left for the southern fishery. In 1859 the trade from London ended.

=== France ===
In 1786, William Rotch, Sr. established a colony of Nantucket whalemen in Dunkirk. By 1789 Dunkirk had 14 whaling ships sailing to Brazil, Walvis Bay, and other areas of the South Atlantic to hunt sperm and right whales. In 1790 Rotch sent the first French whalers into the Pacific. The majority of the French whaling ships were lost during the Anglo-French War (1793-1802). Whaling began to revive after the war ended, but when Napoleon came to power Rotch's holdings in Dunkirk were seized.

After the Napoleonic Wars the government issued subsidies in an attempt to revive whaling, and in 1832 this effort succeeded. In 1835 the first French whaleship, the Gange, reached the Gulf of Alaska and found abundant right whales. In 1836, the first French whaler reached New Zealand. In 1851, the French government passed a law to encourage whaling but this was not successful. Whaling in France ended in 1868.

=== Iceland ===
In 1883 the first whaling station was established in Alptafjordur, Iceland, by a Norwegian company. Between 1889 and 1903 nine more companies established themselves in Iceland. Catching peaked in 1902, when 1,305 whales were caught to produce 40,000 barrels of oil. Whale hunting had largely declined by 1910, when only 170 whales were caught.

A ban on whaling was imposed by the Althing in 1915. In 1935 an Icelandic company established a whaling station that shut down after only five seasons. In 1948, another Icelandic company, Hvalur hf., purchased a naval base at the head of Hvalfjörður and converted it into a whaling station. Between 1948 and 1975, an average of 250 Fin, 65 Sei, and 78 sperm whales were taken annually, as well as a few blue and humpback whales. Unlike the majority of commercial whaling at the time, this operation was based on the sale of frozen meat and meat meal, rather than oil. Most of the meat was exported to England, while the meal was sold locally as cattle feed.

=== Scandinavia ===
There is strong evidence of active, large-scale whaling in Scandinavia from the 6th century onwards.

Scandinavia's whaling industry invented many new techniques in the 19th century, with most inventions occurring in Norway. Jacob Nicolai Walsøe was probably the first person to suggest the idea of using a small steamboat with a gun mounted in the bows, while Arent Christian Dahl experimented with a combination of an explosive and a harpoon in a single projectile, in the Varanger Fjord (1857–1860). In 1863 Svend Foyn invented a harpoon with a flexible joint between the head and shaft and adapted Walsøe and Dahl's ideas, initiating the modern whaling era.

Later, cannon-fired harpoons, strong cables, and steam winches were mounted on maneuverable, steam-powered catcher boats. They made possible the targeting of large and fast-swimming whale species that were taken to shore-based stations for processing. Breech-loading cannons were introduced in 1925; pistons were introduced in 1947 to reduce recoil. These highly efficient devices reduced whale populations to the point where large-scale commercial whaling became unsustainable.

==== Finnmark ====
In February 1864, Svend Foyn began his first whale-hunting trip to Finnmark in the schooner-rigged, steam-driven whale catcher Spes et Fides (Hope & Faith). The ship had seven guns on her forecastle, each firing a harpoon and grenade separately. Several whales were seen, but only four were captured. After two unsuccessful trips in 1866 and 1867, he invented a harpoon gun that fired a grenade and harpoon at the same time and was able to catch thirty whales in 1868. He patented his grenade-tipped harpoon gun two years later.

Foyn was given a virtual monopoly on the trade in Finnmark in 1873, which lasted until 1882. Despite this, local citizens established a whaling company in 1876, and soon others defied his monopoly and formed companies. Unrestricted hunting began in 1883, triggering a large increase in the number of whale catchers. At the peak, in 1896–1898, between 1,000 and 1,200 whales were caught each year. The last station closed down in 1904.

==== Spitsbergen ====
In 1903, the wooden steamship Telegraf (737 gross tons) embarked on a whale catching trip to Spitsbergen. She returned with 1,960 barrels of oil produced from a catch of 57 whales, of which 42 were blue whales. By 1905, there were eight companies operating around Spitsbergen and Bear Island, and 559 whales (337 blue) were caught to produce 18,660 barrels. Operations were suspended in 1912.

=== Faroe Islands ===
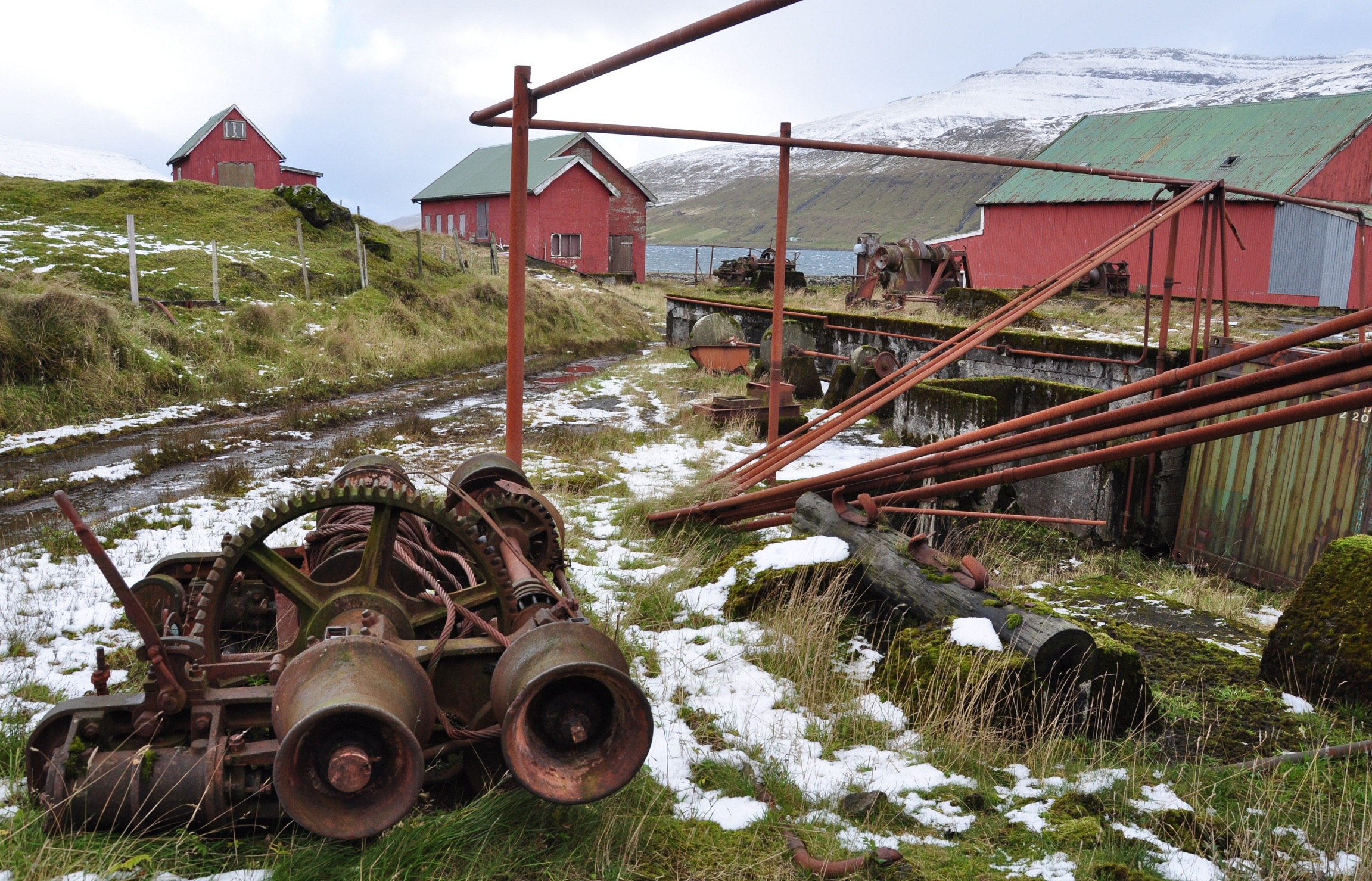
The Whaling Station Við Áir on Streymoy, Faroe Islands, is the only Norwegian built whaling station in the northern hemisphere still standing. It is being renovated into a museum.

Whaling stations in the Faroe Islands have included Gjánoyri on Streymoy (est. 1894), Norðdepil on Borðoy (1898–1920), Lopra on Suðuroy (1901–1953), Funningsfjørður on Eysturoy (est. 1901), and Við Áir (1905–1984) on Streymoy.

Peak catching was reached in 1909, when 773 whales were caught to produce 13,850 barrels of oil. In 1917, with the war and poor catches, whaling was suspended. The islanders' main interest in whaling was cheap meat, while 90% of the proceeds from the oil went abroad, mostly to Norway. Four Norwegian companies resumed catching in 1920 but quickly stopped. In 1933 the two remaining whaling stations in Lopra and Við Áir were taken over by Faroese owners. From 1977 to 1984 the whaling station Við Áir was owned and operated by the Faroese government.

The buildings and the equipment of Við Áir whaling station are still in existence. The Faroese Ministry of Culture (Mentamálaráðið) recommended conservation in 2007, suggesting that the whaling station be made into a maritime museum with activities for the visitors.

=== South Africa ===
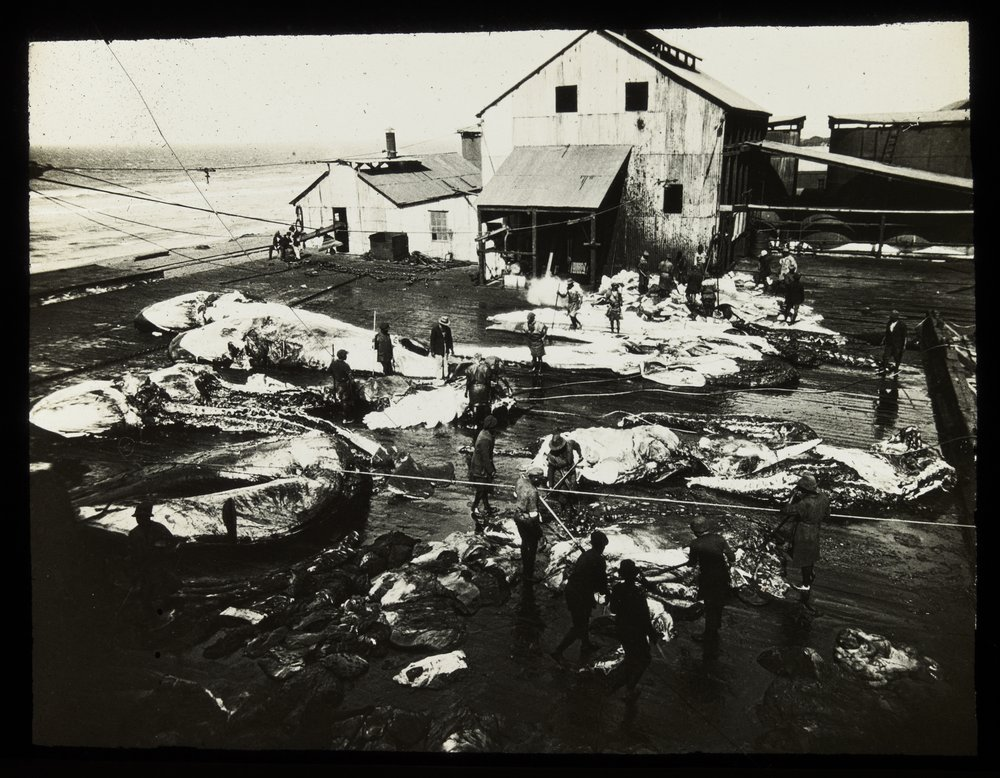
Men working at whaling station, South Africa.

The practise of whaling in South Africa gained momentum at the start of the 19th century and ended in 1975. By the mid-1960s, South Africa had depleted their population of fin whales, and subsequently those of sperm and sei whales, and had to resort to hunting the small and less-profitable minke whale. Minke whales continued to be caught and brought to the Durban whaling station from 1968 until 1975. South Africa comprehensively banned whaling in 1979.

== Twentieth century ==
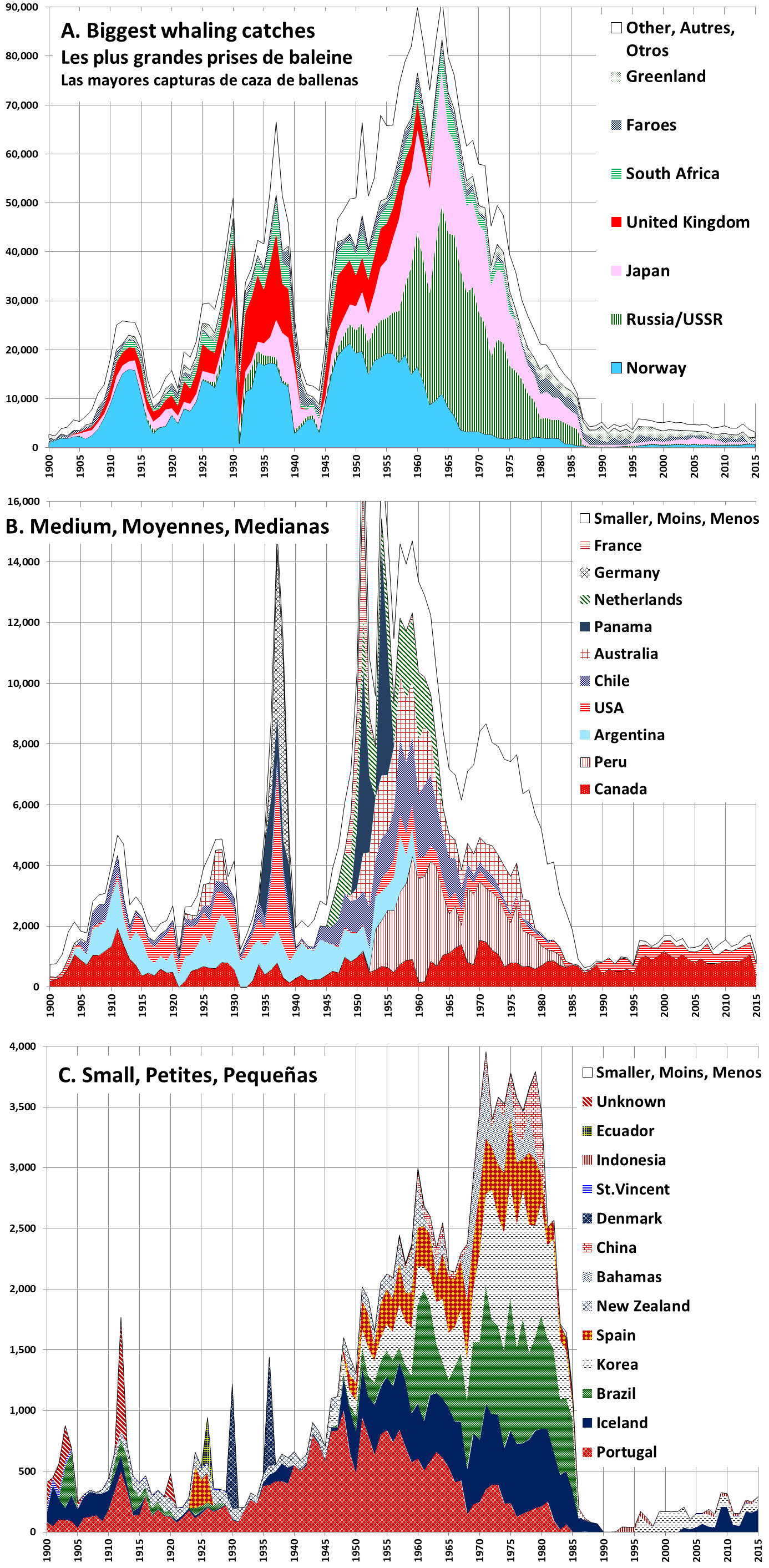
Whales caught, by year and country

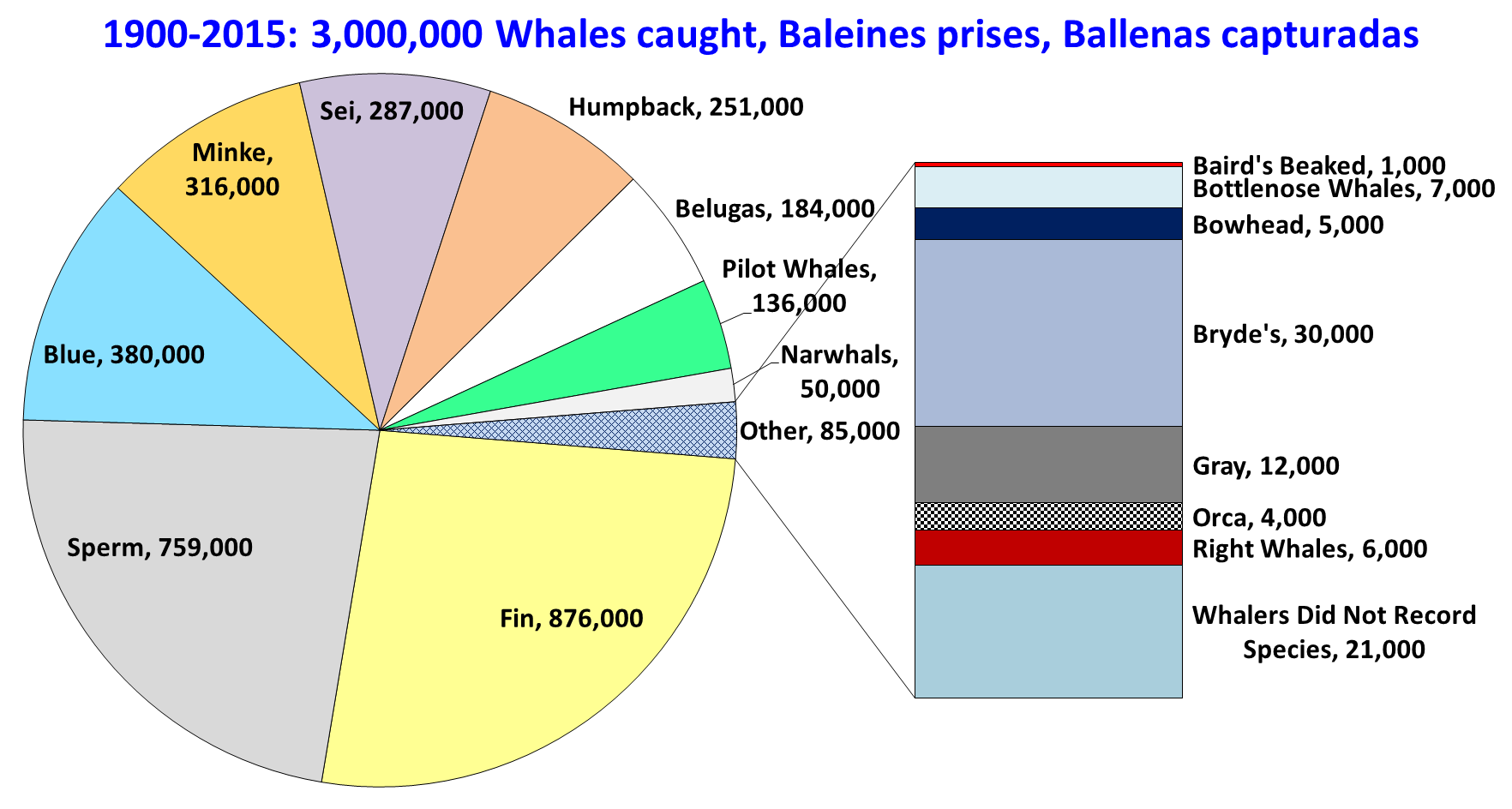
Total whales caught since 1900, by species

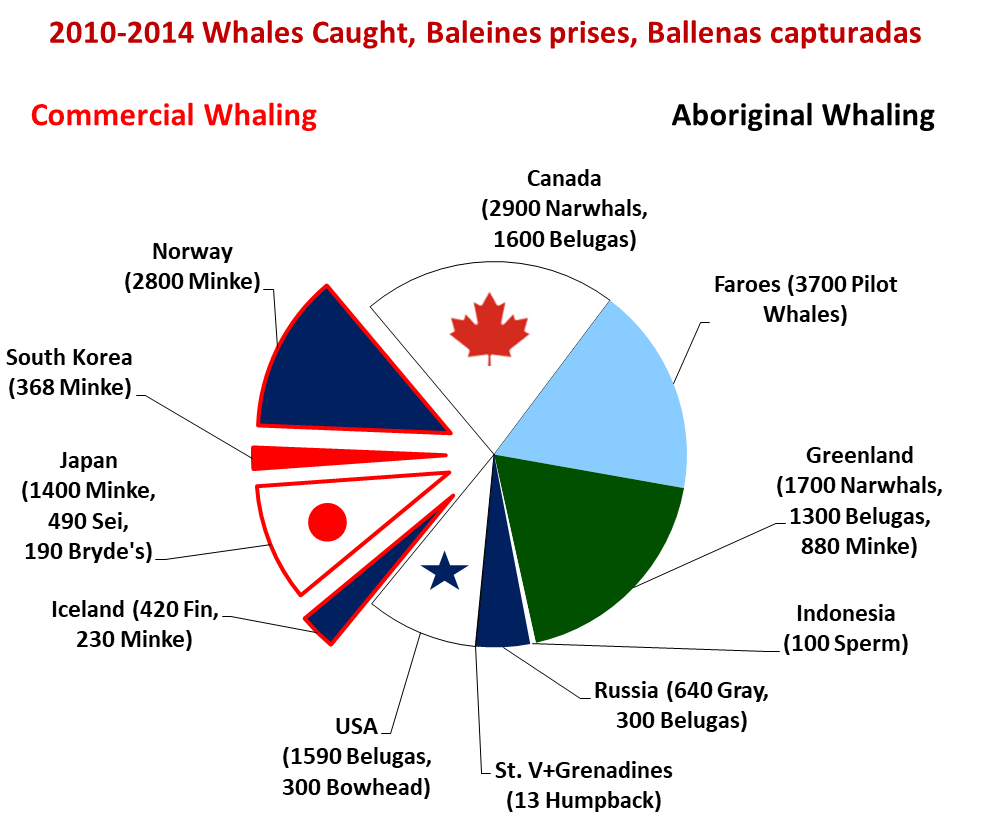
Total whales caught 2010–2014, by country

By 1900, bowhead, gray, and right whales were nearly extinct, and whaling had declined. It revived with the invention of harpoons shot from cannons with explosive tips, which allowed the capture of faster-swimming rorquals. Whaling expanded in the northern hemisphere, then in the southern as the Antarctic ocean was investigated; the first Antarctic shore stations were established on the island of South Georgia in 1904, taking 195 whales that year. Land stations were the centre of the Antarctic whaling industry until the late 1920s, when pelagic whaling increased. (The stations remained in use until around 1960, when Norwegian–British Antarctic whaling came to an end.) The invention of the stern slipway allowed whaling vessels to become factory ships, hauling their catch on board for processing and operating in open water; by the 1930/31 season there were 41 factory ships, which took over 37,000 whales. As each species was reduced to the point where it became hard to find, whalers moved on to the next, catching blue whales, fin whales, sperm whales, sei whales and minke whales in sequence.

The League of Nations held a conference on whaling in 1927, and in 1931 twenty seven countries signed a convention on its regulation. The convention was not enforceable, and overproduction caused a catastrophic plunge in the price of whale oil. In 1932, whaling companies formed a cartel and adopted quotas in Blue Whale Units, which reduced harvests for two years but then failed. A 1937 convention agreed to shorter seasons and to sparing bowhead, gray and right whales, as well as whales under a minimum size. Ships killed faster to harvest as many as possible in the shorter season.

World War II paused the whale harvest, but the post-war shortage of animal fats made whaling look especially profitable. To avoid a repeat of the pre-war overexplotation, meetings in London in 1945 and Washington in 1946 led to 15 whaling nations signing an International Convention for the Regulation of Whaling, "to provide for the proper conservation of whale stocks and thus make possible the orderly development of the whaling industry". This was to be implemented by the newly-formed International Whaling Commission, whose membership was also open to non-whaling nations. The tension between the conservation of whales and the development of the whaling industry was a recurring theme in the IWC's history.

One of the IWC's first acts was creating a whale sanctuary that prohibited killing gray, humpback and right whales, limiting hunting seasons, and setting an Antarctic limit of 16,000 Blue Whale Units per year—but again, it had no enforcement ability. As the quota was for all nations combined, rather than per country, it created a "whale Olympics" in which each whaling fleet competed to catch as much as possible before the quota was reached. The number of catcher boats increased from 129 in 1946/47 to 263 in 1951/52. Between 1949 and 1952 more than 2,000 humpbacks per year were harvested in the Antarctic, despite an annual quota of 1,250. In 1959–1964, there were disagreements over a moratorium on blue whales and humpbacks, with scientific advice eventually recommending a limit of 2,800 Blue Whale Units. The IWC adopted quotas of 8,000. In 1970 the United States prohibited the import of whale products by adding all commercial whale species to its Endangered Species List.

Proposals for 10-year moratoria were rejected in 1971, 1972, and 1974, failing to reach the three-quarters majority needed under the Convention. The Blue Whale Unit was abandoned as a measure, however, and reduced species quotas were adopted. Consumer boycotts of Japanese and Russian products began in 1974, to protest the hunting of large whales by these countries. By 1976 the IWC had a permanent Secretariat based in Cambridge, and an International Decade of Cetacean Research was declared.

In 1978, the IWC called for an end to international trade in whale products. In 1979 pelagic whaling for all species except minke whales was ended, and a 50 million km² Indian Ocean Whale Sanctuary was created. The composition of the IWC had changed, from 18 member nations in 1963 (of which only 4 were non-whaling), to 39 in 1982, only 13 of which hunted whales (and three of those only through aboriginal/substence whaling). In 1982, the IWC adopted a pause or "moratorium" on commercial whaling, to commence in 1986. Japan, Norway, and the USSR filed objections so the moratorium would not apply to them. Chile and Peru also filed objections, but Peru later agreed to be covered, and Chile ceased whaling. In 1994 the Southern Ocean Whale Sanctuary was created, after the discovery that USSR had been harvesting protected whale species in the Southern Ocean for 30 years and falsifying its records to conceal this.

By 2000, only Norway was carrying out commercial whaling of minke whales. "Scientific whaling" for research purposes continued, primarily by Japan—a provision allowed for under the Convention, though most member nations urged Japan to stop issuing the permits as these were widely perceived as a way to evade the moratorium decision. Subsistence whaling by indigenous people in Greenland, Russia, Alaska, and St Vincent and The Grenadines of several species (mostly bowhead, gray, and fin whales) also continued under an Aboriginal Whaling Scheme administered by the IWC. No international quotas were ever put on beluga whales and narwhals; 1,000 to 2,000 of each have been killed each year to the present, mostly in Alaska, Canada and Greenland. Research became a significant part of the IWC's mission, with non-lethal monitoring of whale stocks in the Southern Ocean carried out each year since 1978 and the launch of the Journal of Cetacean Research and Management in 1999.

=== Catches by country and year ===
Sources: IWC Summary Catch Database version 6.1, July 2016, which includes great whales, orcas (mostly caught by Norway and USSR), bottlenose whales (mostly Norway), pilot whales (mostly Norway), and Baird's Beaked Whales (mostly Japan). This database also has some pre-1900 counts, not shown here.

The IWC database is supplemented by Faroese catches of pilot whales, Greenland's and Canada's catches of Narwhals (data 1954–2014), Belugas from multiple sources shown in the Beluga whale article, Indonesia's catches of sperm whales, bycatch in Japan 1980–2008, and bycatch in Korea 1996–2017. The IWC database includes illegal whaling from USSR and Korea. This is supplemented by academic findings on Korea for 1999–2003.

Most species of dolphins are omitted. Otherwise the main areas of missing data are: bycatch in countries other than Japan and Korea (generally much smaller), narwhals before 1954; belugas in Canada and USA before 1970, and in Nunavut (Canada) for all years; belugas in USSR in Bering, East Siberian and Laptev Seas and Sea of Okhotsk outside Amur River area.

Numbers of whales caught each year, by country, from 1900 to 2017
Year	Total	Norway	Russia /USSR	Japan	United Kingdom	South Africa	Faroe Islands	Greenland	Canada	Peru	Argentina	USA	Chile	Australia	Panama	Netherlands	Germany	France	Portugal	Iceland	Brazil	South Korea	Spain	New Zealand	Bahamas	China	Denmark	St.Vincent+ Grenadines	Indonesia	Ecuador	Unknown	Philippines	Tonga	Bermuda
Total	3,324,190	796,889	633,322	615,890	322,758	169,388	141,647	107,126	83,406	56,349	51,438	50,031	47,069	39,361	30,982	27,800	12,451	8,960	29,925	23,479	22,609	21,803	12,705	5,924	4,270	3,269	1,924	507	416	371	1,910	96	114	1
2017	1,274						1,203															71												
2016	698						295	246	157													96												
2015	3,094	660	125	520			508	314	388			375								184		103						1	3					
2014	3,686	736	177	196			48	885	1,062			399								161		67						2	20					
2013	4,807	594	181	475			1,104	887	937			424								169		70						4	20					
2012	3,927	464	217	424			713	772	830			429								52		79						2	20					
2011	3,952	533	193	540			726	683	837			339								58		75						2	20					
2010	4,402	468	180	445			1,107	726	844			389								208		85						3	20					
2009	4,096	484	170	825			310	981	792			291								206		97						1	20					
2008	3,813	536	187	1,138				939	777			304								38		86						2	20					
2007	4,594	597	161	1,068			633	763	781			640								45		102						1	39					
2006	4,442	545	187	991			856	703	946			265								68		82						1	3					
2005	4,476	639	187	1,365			302	911	797			350								39		110						2	3					
2004	4,573	544	167	868			1,010	886	897			278								25		77							3					
2003	4,866	647	187	841			503	1,390	1,098			292								37		165						1	2					
2002	4,813	634	174	804			626	1,360	914			412										165						2	2					
2001	5,141	552	165	711			918	1,365	1,036			491										165						2						
2000	4,856	487	156	5,632			588	1,575	1,186			327										165						3						
1999	4,926	591	191	639			608	1,710	1,020			265										165						2						
1998	5,435	625	188	590			815	2,026	893			396										45						2						
1997	5,557	503	132	638			1,162	1,798	1,042			342										78							40					
1996	5,681	388	96	617			1,524	1,759	924			432										129						1	40					
1995	3,582	218	143	640			228	1,728	455			230																	40					
1994	4,635	280	97	451			1,201	1,747	588			331																	40					
1993	4,221	226	53	430			808	1,815	526			421																2	40					
1992	4,686	95	53	430			1,572	1,886	517			231																2						
1991	3,782	1	222	381			722	1,591	596			362																						
1990	5,132	5	215	420			917	2,852	437			379																						
1989	4,388	17	259	423			1,260	1,669	743			42								68														
1988	4,205	29	210	334			1,738	1,305	554			49								78								1						
1987	5,797	373	226	1,215			1,450	1,994	466			54							3	100								2	7					
1986	10,973	379	3,442	2,933			1,676	1,724	686			30								116		69						2	9					
1985	13,430	771	3,625	3,180			2,595	1,439	742			18								344	598	123	48									40		
1984	14,769	804	4,226	3,480			1,923	1,941	648			195							63	440	600	393	102									47		
1983	16,532	1,860	3,827	4,502			1,694	1,714	725	330		255	4						21	448	625	488	120					3				9		
1982	19,061	1,956	3,684	4,707			2,655	2,039	864	320		360							95	564	854	901	150					5						
1981	20,897	1,890	4,187	5,437			2,912	2,522	844	387		238	64						251	598	749	765	146											
1980	21,114	2,054	3,847	5,125			2,775	2,194	709	661		297	94						211	640	932	932	234			498		4						
1979	24,093	2,202	7,404	5,264			1,685	1,844	589	1,042		172	99						197	638	766	924	547		110	605		5						
1978	26,832	1,656	9,371	6,027			1,199	2,083	692	1,070		197	198	679					173	589	714	1,056	596		321	198		2					11	
1977	30,172	1,780	12,216	6,942			899	1,971	663	1,193		359	55	625					152	580	1,030	1,059	248		147	248					1		4	
1976	35,864	2,159	13,486	10,288			536	1,744	798	1,918		277	87	997					126	600	788	1,016	516		215	307		2					4	
1975	39,500	1,770	14,934	10,945		1,821	1,090	1,520	788	1,343		228	106	1,174					237	604	1,096	947	539		278	72							8	
1974	47,430	1,830	19,622	14,146		1,938	684	1,716	673	1,812		242	161	1,081					234	459	797	973	497		453	106		2					4	
1973	49,485	2,053	20,079	14,363		1,857	1,050	2,161	1,075	1,838		209	246	972					388	580	732	907	422		493	50		2	5				3	
1972	45,300	2,695	15,737	14,818		1,855	512	1,636	1,218	1,900		225	352	955					390	580	774	1,075	346		149	78		5						
1971	57,651	2,752	22,548	18,776		2,360	1,018	1,531	1,489	1,773		332	253	864					353	700	975	755	460		611	99		2						
1970	57,923	3,280	24,263	17,984		2,058	390	1,539	1,543	1,930		344	301	805					249	511	803	740	520		598	63		2						
1969	62,805	3,288	29,567	17,393		2,208	1,395	1,637	747	2,310		386	254	679					228	583	754	421	394		480	79		2						
1968	61,594	3,280	28,364	17,926		1,413	1,694	1,813	818	2,446		379	428	658					149	369	559	344	483		415	54		2						
1967	67,628	3,639	32,700	19,333		2,730	1,998	1,074	1,391	645		484	744	587					425	482	563	356	416			59		2						
1966	76,066	6,489	36,977	18,874		4,179	1,509	1,057	1,281	1,378		475	1,099	606					410	501	448	328	398			55		2						
1965	79,805	8,167	35,592	20,988		5,460	1,637	794	1,126	1,305		483	1,348	752					530	492	229	389	461			51		1						
1964	91,783	11,097	38,482	27,554		4,246	1,383	566	1,057	2,017		525	1,508	802					611	490	304	513	378	139		109		2						
1963	83,052	9,707	31,947	23,966		4,505	2,215	444	691	3,270		500	1,543	744		1,182			658	486	406	348	210	123		104		3						
1962	73,053	8,748	22,808	21,406	1,591	3,947	1,826	483	859	3,301		497	2,337	1,321		1,330			583	544	756	252	323	35		106								
1961	82,306	13,370	24,907	21,081	4,324	3,365	1,892	474	168	3,476		662	2,336	1,937		1,628			507	408	1,083	192	330	81		69							16	
1960	89,861	16,601	27,757	20,523	5,813	3,531	1,817	456	158	3,423		679	2,084	1,809		2,212			606	452	813	314	324	361		110		2					16	
1959	81,997	15,008	21,936	19,795	5,171	3,441	1,426	528	907	3,407	932	770	2,233	1,811		2,082		179	572	405	315	388	294	320		58		3					16	
1958	78,951	19,057	14,100	20,259	5,425	3,027	2,676	480	882	2,554	923	718	2,316	2,095		2,226			701	544	128	358	239	183		40		4					16	
1957	74,023	17,416	10,533	18,733	7,083	2,536	2,284	845	733	2,381	1,861	693	2,512	2,100		1,867			842	553	125	350	347	186		27							16	
1956	65,923	19,215	8,355	15,089	6,266	2,824	1,962	739	486	2,027	1,108	607	1,633	2,051	33	1,434			740	461	217	232	273	159		12								
1955	65,782	19,304	7,142	11,928	7,445	3,502	1,046	564	646	1,887	812	486	1,298	1,854	4,077	1,665			839	444	213	215	292	112		11								
1954	67,882	18,466	7,559	10,890	7,912	2,723	2,041	820	682	1,509	947	462	1,328	2,039	7,600	848			807	388	202	197	282	180										
1953	55,178	17,804	6,568	7,373	7,620	3,904	2,269	54	561	1,340	1,083	42	1,198	2,001		1,711			637	411	184	181	128	109										
1952	51,402	15,051	6,424	5,876	6,966	4,912	1,265	54	484	95	678	13	1,374	1,787	2,492	1,575		436	789	327	168	240	274	122										
1951	66,402	19,718	5,717	6,467	6,959	5,267	3,197	59	1,141	61	812	64	1,094	1,224	6,160	1,650		4,793	945	402	179	146	236	111										
1950	51,038	19,339	4,605	4,988	6,315	4,352	994	79	974		796	24	1,093	388	1,927	1,660		2,196	481	345	128	129	146	79										
1949	50,799	21,345	3,909	3,987	9,124	4,022	1,262	33	835		946	60	991	193		1,295		1,356	656	359	38	112	134	141		1								
1948	48,570	20,292	2,545	3,746	10,138	4,765	858	157	989		920	75	1,116	4		1,364			1,001	275	36	150	47	92										
1947	46,668	18,704	1,595	3,513	11,348	4,365	2,155	364	471		832	59	851	2		1,294			835	22	25	122		111										
1946	35,555	14,955	1,024	3,169	7,349	3,550	1,155	473	529		857	18	598			777			831	34		126		110										
1945	20,826	9,264	536	610	5,064	729	1,594	337	393		1,082	18	495						581	16				107										
1944	11,665	3,164	350	2,416		819	1,386	700	264		1,296	13	430						724	15				88										
1943	12,586	5,963	611	1,776		724	1,037	267	243		962	40	61						796	16				90										
1942	12,894	5,660	689	1,456		498	1,931	690	234		998	47	54						548	18				71										
1941	16,391	4,129	666	3,168	359	759	4,475	659	400		1,066	59	59						501	5				86										
1940	26,213	2,968	590	12,909	3,135	1,035	2,847	780	292		868	49	78						552	1				109										
1939	45,736	12,407	606	9,441	9,928	4,577	3,535	657	144		705	1,229	469		1,421		5		400	131				81										
1938	51,446	13,385	428	9,660	10,030	4,214	2,293	170	310		1,024	2,231	338		907		5,813		417	148				77				1						
1937	66,569	17,091	1,282	7,752	17,791	6,503	1,061	133	800		1,062	5,277	375		1,527		5,361		417	80				56				1						
1936	52,363	17,344	1,370	3,848	15,184	3,977	1,727	159	568		1,014	1,997	266		2,389		1,080		387	86				69			897	1						
1935	41,619	16,844	2,013	2,483	10,940	3,351	740	85	401		944	595	306		2,449				379	30				57				2						
1934	42,358	17,549	2,372	1,766	13,632	3,340	274	318	753		809	685	568						234	4				52				2						
1933	36,644	12,109	4,183	1,396	13,044	2,377	1,065	217	209		1,139	390	193						266	10				44				2						
1932	33,785	11,365	2,870	1,371	11,960	2,191	1,282	1,036			996	333	175						179	5				18				3						1
1931	18,211	859	2,309	1,239	8,722	826	2,386	636			850	29	156						80	7				109				3						
1930	50,989	27,399	1,937	1,730	11,235	3,638	526	378	572		1,174	907	275						99	9				79			1,027	4						
1929	42,303	21,368	1,959	1,463	9,097	3,040	195	1,550	791		1,386	732	386						219	9				102				6						
1928	33,485	16,169	1,774	1,505	5,509	2,308	779	571	815		1,592	741	334	1,036					191	9	40			105				7						
1927	28,268	12,286	1,155	1,568	4,403	2,424	195	1,376	618		1,441	1,046	398	999					166	9	47			128				9						
1926	29,554	13,261	325	1,754	4,742	2,632	477	2,008	628		812	748	484	740					202	9	32		241	78				10		371				
1925	29,330	13,887	216	1,588	5,563	2,467	610	1,091	680		1,079	706	238	669					151	20	42		219	96				8						
1924	21,728	9,416	91	1,523	4,427	2,047	134	1,079	594		781	721	257						114	20	62		345	109				8						
1923	18,472	7,453	89	1,435	3,116	1,710	1,149	874	525		540	912	217	166					177	20				81				8						
1922	19,607	7,974	127	1,280	4,207	1,285	650	1,455	188		819	1,059	202	155					121	20				59				6						
1921	12,098	4,969	88	1,483	2,103	1,071	1,264				438	304	181						78	20				92				7						
1920	15,758	6,658	103	1,281	2,683	1,169	992	201	493		662	915	120						124	6	43			108				6			194			
1919	14,240	4,382	104	3,340	1,896	1,039	153	1,141	473		402	857	161						132	6	29			119				6						
1918	11,421	4,093	51	2,177	1,600	565	848	2	602		414	528	195						183	6	62			90				5						
1917	10,193	2,914	739	1,689	2,086	480	263	212	379		406	529	193						128	6	62			98				9						
1916	14,151	5,520	562	1,798	2,094	1,129	499	452	464		511	528	131						295	6	68			82				12						
1915	22,523	10,886	83	2,096	3,883	980	1,305	602	370		1,169	662	80						142	64	82			111				8						
1914	25,614	15,820		2,024	2,548	1,289	291	673	731		1,106	560	115						135	36	190			93				3						
1913	25,700	16,024		1,605	2,895	1,659	217	599	927		577	234	245						342	56	220			92				8						
1912	25,912	15,211		1,586	2,698	993	725	3	1,398		878	322	330						497	138	125			63				6			939			
1911	25,064	12,493	120	1,979	2,889	547	1,741	303	1,959		1,576	230	563						337	142	102			77				6						
1910	18,164	8,933		968	2,483	233	1,448	101	1,342		1,639	38	539						183	161				90				6						
1909	12,876	6,099	9	835	1,645	100	942	165	1,190		997	52	493						88	229				32										
1908	11,113	3,839	16	1,312	798		2,005	113	1,052		956	107	588						136	182				8				1						
1907	7,804	2,524	3	1,086	648		477	244	1,058		846	93	480						124	207				8				6						
1906	6,424	1,807	4	1,472	429		534	405	741		321	29	374						117	172				8				11						
1905	5,356	2,323	150	446	264		330	6	894		399	105	130				60		33	153				8				11			44			
1904	5,694	2,242		428	179		699	8	1,077		195	86					85		91	212	359			8				25						
1903	4,233	1,879	1	132			391	10	642			253	1				47		99	98	338			8				37			297			
1902	3,893	1,974	226	89			526	10	342			159							102	172				8				51			234			
1901	2,416	1,515		60			70	10	258			55							49	340				8				51						
1900	2,721	1,048	5	42			875	9	190			143							83	66				8				51			201			

=== Catches by country and species ===
Sources: same as counts by year, above.

Numbers of whales caught, by country and species: Total 1900–2015
Countries	Total	Fin	Sperm	Blue	Minke	Sei	Humpback	Belugas	Pilot	Narwhals	Baird's Beaked	Bottlenose	Bowhead	Bryde's	Gray	Orca	Right Whales	Species not recorded
Argentina	51,438	26,432	1,497	8,936		6,122	8,233										218	
Australia	39,361	3	14,844	32	1	6	24,468							7				
Bahamas	4,270	418	571	3	14	3,022								242				
Bermuda	1		1															
Brazil	22,609	89	929	2	14,330	5,077	1,430							31			6	715
Canada	83,406	21,820	6,649	3,034	959	4,833	7,152	12,958	324	23,259	41	26	38		13	7	8	2,285
Chile	47,069	6,741	30,982	4,299		1,711	2,046							3		3	274	1,010
China	3,269	15			1,821									1,430	3			
Denmark	1,924	668	4	1,223			29											
Ecuador	371	272		68		15	16											
Faroe Islands	141,647	5,215	682	168	124	925	104		134,089			16					4	320
France	8,960	15	3,287	1		649	5,007										1	
Germany	12,451	7,062	1,059	3,885		15	237										1	192
Greenland	107,126	1,101	146	44	10,228	19	471	68,268	1	26,828		5	10			5		
Iceland	23,479	11,295	2,948	622	5,005	2,674	83										1	851
Indonesia	416		416															
Japan	615,890	165,214	176,320	26,518	79,990	131,913	10,992		482		439			16,360	1,478	5	189	5,990
South Korea	21,803	1,176			20,349	3	13		1					2	47	3	2	207
Netherlands	27,800	18,833	3,748	3,457	1	457	1,303										1	
New Zealand	5,924	1	266	5		5	5,580							19			48	
Norway	796,889	313,920	53,460	177,255	131,940	31,001	72,633		1,373			6,340	1	462	232	2,500	462	5,310
Panama	30,982	10,229	9,650	5,913		39	5,151											
Peru	56,349	1,107	48,182	218		2,929	324							3,589				
Philippines	96													96				
Portugal	29,925	509	28,132	171	1	7	1,077							27			1	
Russia/Soviet Union	633,322	61,623	274,673	14,630	50,005	67,112	56,605	86,965	2		173	115	513	5,529	9,495	1,727	4,140	15
South Africa	169,388	50,712	64,617	20,378	1,139	14,445	14,282					2		1,776		36	57	1,944
Spain	12,705	5,128	6,777	21		478	2											299
Saint Vincent and the Grenadines	507		3				502							2				
Tonga	114						114											
United Kingdom	322,758	157,070	27,594	105,404	6	13,176	18,466					33		86		4	171	748
United States	50,031	8,425	1,937	3,119	9	483	14,197	16,213			17	10	4,437	2	854	6	22	300
Unknown	1,910	538	1	115		31	447					1					2	775
Total	3,324,190	875,631	759,375	379,521	315,922	287,147	250,964	184,404	136,272	50,087	670	6,548	4,999	29,663	12,122	4,296	5,608	20,961

== See also ==
- Whaling in Australia
- Whaling in Canada
- Whaling in the Netherlands
- Whaling in New Zealand
- Whaling in Norway
- Whaling in Scotland
- Whaling in the Soviet Union and Russia
- Whaling in the United Kingdom
- Whaling in the United States
  - Nantucket Whaling Museum
