= Skeiðin =

Mountain above the village of Sørvágur in the Faroe Islands

Coordinates: 62°03′55″N 7°20′48″W

Skeiðin location on Vágar Island

Skeiðin is a mountain above the village of Sørvágur in the Faroe Islands. It lies between the village itself and the bay of Selvík. On the top of the mountain is a radio transmitter. It is also a location of automatic weather station that provides wind information for aircraft approaching Vágar Airport.

Geoportal kortal.fo refers to the mountain as Skeið.
