= Selvík =

Small bay on the southside of Sørvágsfjørður

Coordinates: 62°04′21″N 7°21′35″W

Selvik location on Vágar

Selvík is a small bay on the southside of Sørvágsfjørður. It is about one kilometer to the west of the village Sørvágur in the Faroe Islands.

In 1901 the owners of the whaling station in Norðdepli, decided to build a new station in Selvík. During the spring of 1902 the Norwegian cargo ship "Viking", and the whaling boat Norddeble came with equipment and material and already in June 1902 whaling activity started from the station.

The station got a brand new whaling boat with the name Selvik in 1904.

The station closed down already in 1912.

Between 1894 and 1905 seven whaling stations were established in the Faroes. These were located in Selvík, Lopra (Suðuroy), Gjánoyri, Norðdepil, Funningsfjørður, Signabøur and Við Áir.
