= Camden (1813 ship) =

British merchant and whaling ship (1813–1850)

History

United Kingdom
- Name: Camden
- Owner: 1813:Simpson, Chapman, and Chapman; 1820:Aaron Chapman (principal managing owner)
- Builder: W.S. Chapman & Co.
- Launched: 1813
- Fate: Last listed 1850

General characteristics
- Tons burthen: 399 or 400 (bm)
- Length: 107 ft 3 in (32.7 m)
- Beam: 29 ft 3 in (8.9 m)
- Propulsion: Sail
- Armament: 8 × 18-pounder carronades (1815)

Camden was built at Whitby in 1813. She served as a general trader for much of her career, though in 1820-21, she made one voyage to Bombay for the British East India Company (EIC). Between 1824 and 1831, Camden sailed under charter to the Hudson's Bay Company. Between 1833 and 1837, she was a Greenland whaler out of the Whitby whale fishery, and was the last vessel from Whitby to engage in whaling. She was last listed in Lloyd's Register in 1850.

== Career ==
Camden first appeared in the registers in the Register of Shipping (RS) in 1814.

Year	Master	Owner	Trade	Source
1814	Peacock	Chapman	Whitby–London	RS
1815	Peacock	Chapman	Whitby–London	RS
1816	Peacock; Johnson	Chapman	London transport	RS

As a government transport, Camden made a voyage to Jamaica. She returned and then, no longer a transport, sailed to Quebec, returning to England on 16 September 1817.

Year	Master	Owner	Trade	Source
1818	Johnson; London	Chapman	London transport–Bengal	RS
1818	Johnson	Chapman	London–Batavia	Lloyd's Register (LR)

In 1813, the EIC had lost its monopoly on the trade between India and Britain. British ships were then free to sail to India or the Indian Ocean under a licence from the EIC. Camden, Johnson, master, sailed for Batavia on 25 February 1818, or 27 March. Camden and a number of other outward bound vessels had ended up waiting at Deal. She sailed to Portsmouth, but after leaving Portsmouth had to put back. She finally sailed from Portsmouth on 31 March, bound for Batavia.

On 15 April 1819, Camden, Johnson, master, was at Mauritius, having come from Batavia and Manila. On 2 October, she sailed from Gravesend, for Amsterdam. (Note: That Camden sailed on to Amsterdam suggests that some part of her cargo included goods still under the EIC's monopoly for the UK market.)

=== EIC voyage (1820-1821) ===
Captain James Johnson sailed from the Downs on 2 May 1820, bound for Bombay. Camden arrived at Bombay on 21 August. Homeward bound, she was at the Cape of Good Hope on 24 January 1821, and arrived at Gravesend on 7 April.

Year	Master	Owner	Trade	Source & notes
1822	Johnson	Chapman	London–Batavia; London–Quebec	LR
1823	Johnson	Chapman	London–Quebec; London–Jamaica	LR; some repairs 1822
1824	Johnson; Bell	Chapman	London–Jamaica	LR; some repairs 1822
1825	Bell	Chapman	London–Honduras	LR; some repairs 1822
1825	[Benjamin] Bell	Chapman	London–Hudson's Bay	RS; some repairs 1822

In 1824, Camden moved her registry to London.

=== Hudson's Bay Company ===
Between 1824 and 1831, Camden sailed under charter to the Hudson's Bay Company.

Year	Master	Owner	Trade	Source & notes
1827	W.Terry	Chapman	London–Hudson's Bay	LR; some repairs 1822 & large repairs 1827
1828	W.Terry	Chapman	London–Hudson's Bay	RS; some repairs 1822 & thorough repairs 1827
1830	Terry; Briggs	Chapman	London–Hudson's Bay; London–Quebec	RS; some repairs 1822 & thorough repairs 1827
1831	Briggs [Robert] Royal	Chapman	London–Hudson's Bay; London–Norway	RS; some repairs 1822 & thorough repairs 1827
1832	Royal; Pearson (or W.Parsons)	Chapman	London–Norway	RS; thorough repairs 1827

=== Whaler ===
Between 1833 and 1837, the Chapmans employed Camden as a whaler in the Whitby whale fishery. Whalers from Whitby had been whaling in Davis Strait since 1753, though by the 1830s the business had almost died out. In 1832, Phoenix, a Chapman-owned ship, was the sole vessel to go out, and she returned with 234 tons of oil (195 Imperial measure), the largest amount ever to have been brought back. The Chapmans therefore sent out Camden in 1833, as well as Phoenix. Both vessels were successful in volume terms: Phoenix returned with 227 tons, and Camden returned with 230 tons. However, whaling became unprofitable as the price of whale oil had fallen. Between 1833 and 1837, it varied between £23 and over £50 per ton. Whalebone prices varied between £30 and £150 per ton. Phoenix and Camden left in 1837, but Phoenix grounded on her way out and came back to port. Camden's voyage proved a failure. The Chapmans withdrew both ships from whaling, and with that whaling from Whitby ended.

Year	Master	Owner	Trade	Whales	Tuns whale oil
1833	W. Parsons	Chapman	London; Whitby whale fishery	26	231
1834	Armstrong	Chapman	Whitby whale fishery		35
1835	Armstrong	Chapman	Whitby whale fishery	6	105

On 31 October 1835, Camden, Armstrong, master, from Davis Strait, and Smales, Sinclair, master, from Quebec, ran afoul of each other. Both received considerable damage.

Year	Master	Owner	Trade	Whales	Tuns whale oil
1836	Armstrong	Chapman	Whitby whale fishery	?	2
1837	Armstrong	Chapman	Whitby whale fishery	0	0
1838	Armstrong	Chapman	Whitby whale fishery		
1839	Armstrong	Chapman	London—Quebec		
Sources: Lloyd's Register. The information was only as current as owners chose to keep it. Also, Lloyd's Register published the next year's volume half-way through the previous year.; Whaling data:Coltish (1842).

On 28 March 1838, Camden sailed to America.

Year	Master	Owner	Trade	Source & notes
1840	Armstrong	Chapman	London—Quebec	LR; large repairs 1836 & small repairs 1841

On at least one of her voyages, in 1845, Camden brought back lumber for the naval dockyard at Chatham.

== Fate ==
Camden last appeared in Lloyd's Register in 1850. Her owner was still Chapman, but she had no master and no trade. The last mention in ship arrival and departure data was in October 1845, when she sailed for Quebec.
