= Whaling in South Africa =

Commercial hunting of whales in South Africa

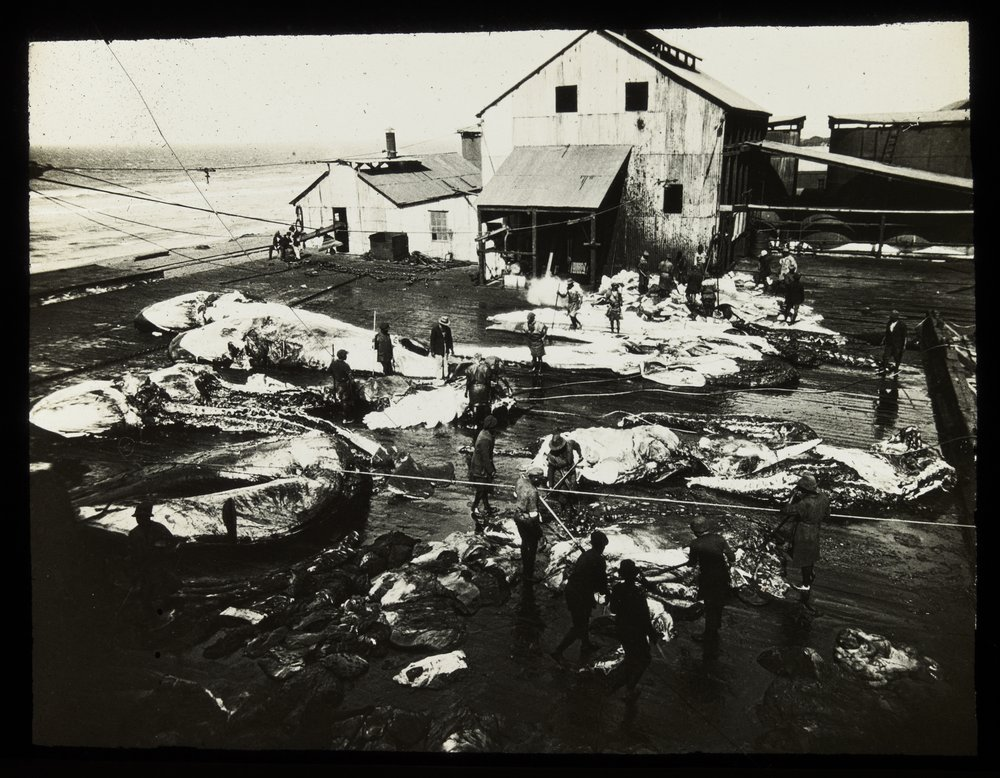
Men working at whaling station, South Africa.

The practise of whaling in South Africa gained momentum at the start of the 19th century and ended in 1975. By the mid-1960s, South Africa had depleted their population of fin whales, and subsequently those of sperm and sei whales, and had to resort to hunting the small and less-profitable minke whale. Minke whales continued to be caught and brought to the Durban whaling station from 1968 until 1975. South Africa comprehensively banned whaling in 1979.

== Gallery ==
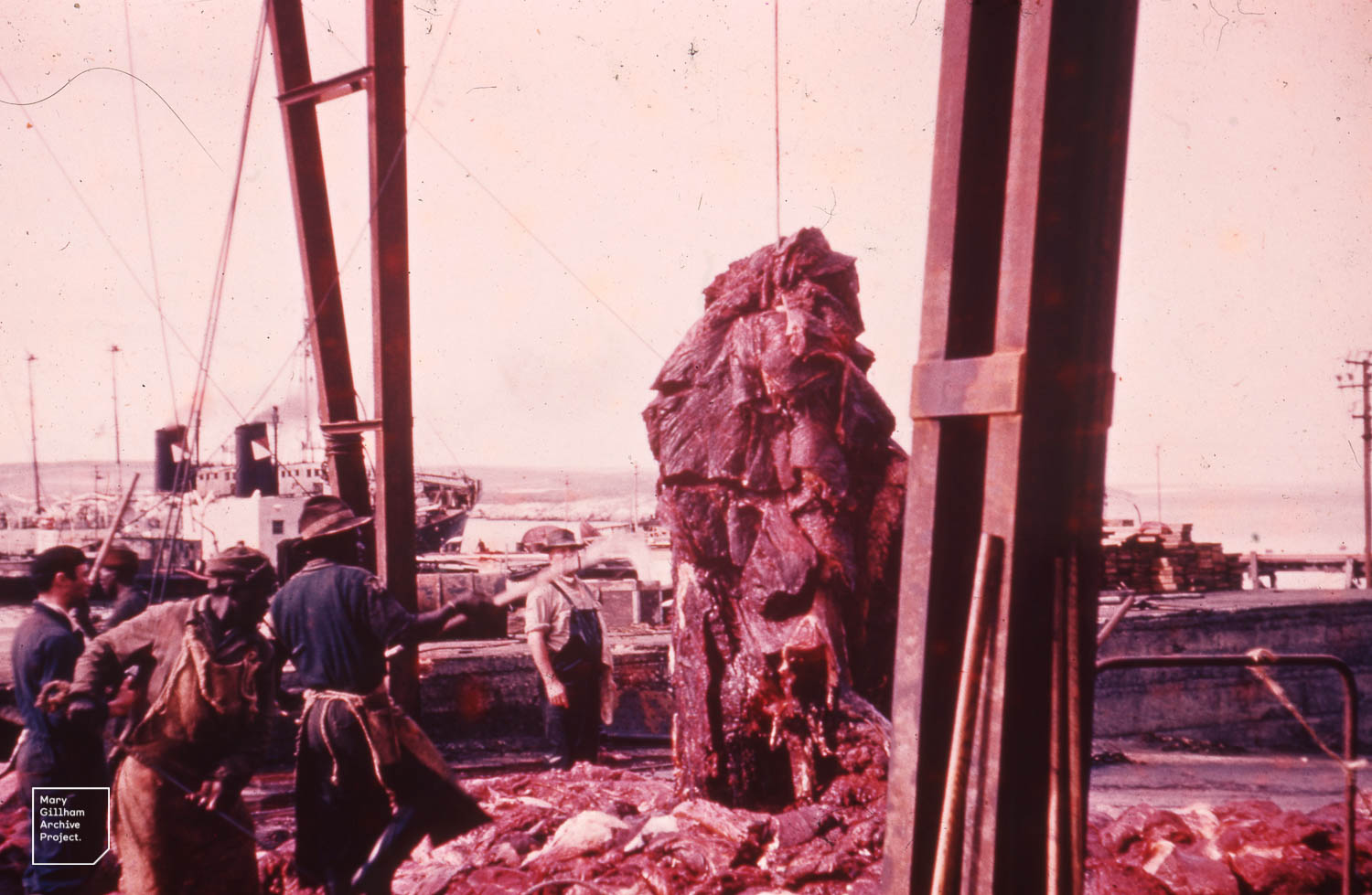
Chunk of fin whale meat at Donkergat whaling station (1960)

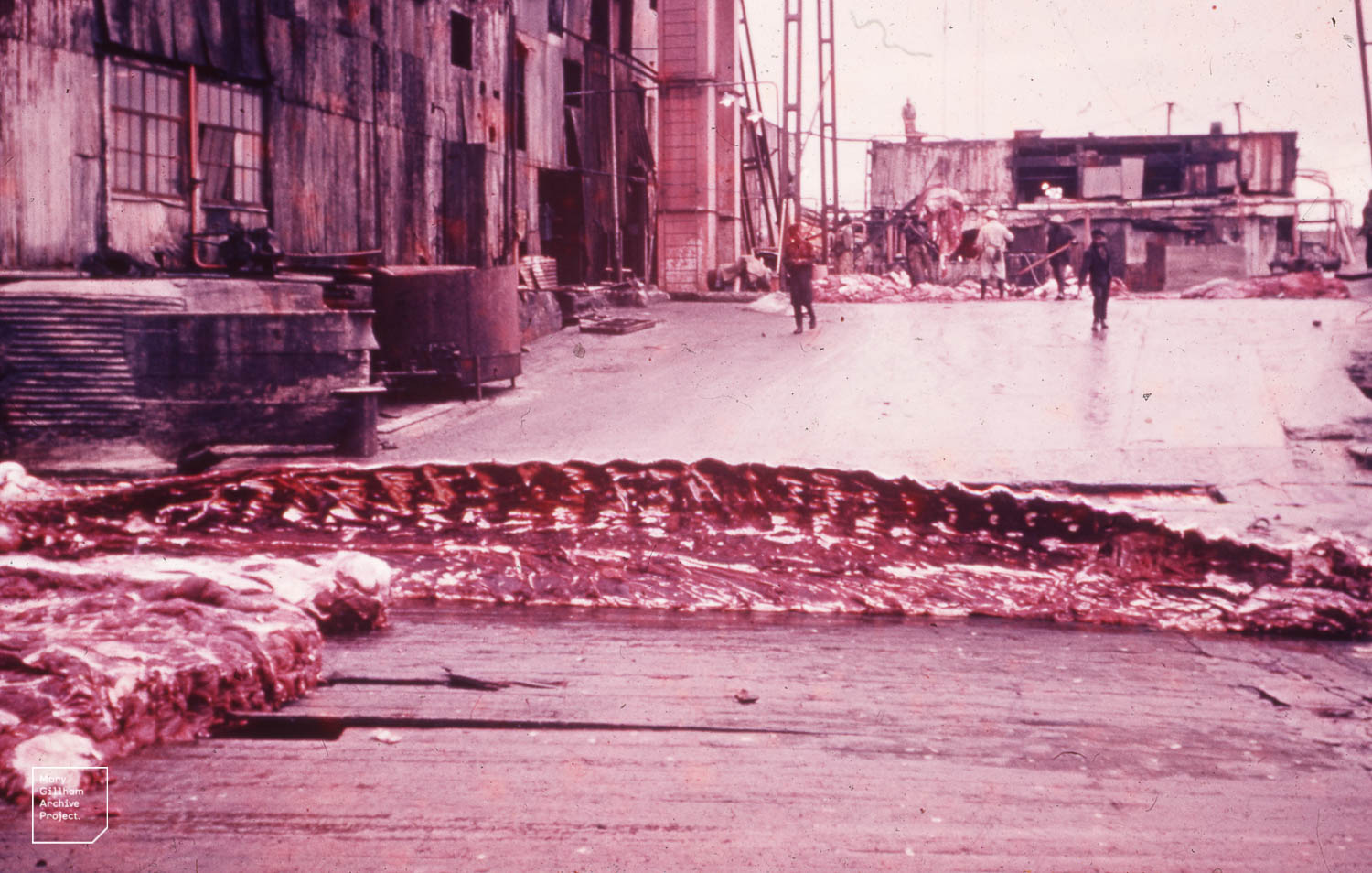
Backbone of fin whale used for bone meal (Bovril) (1960)

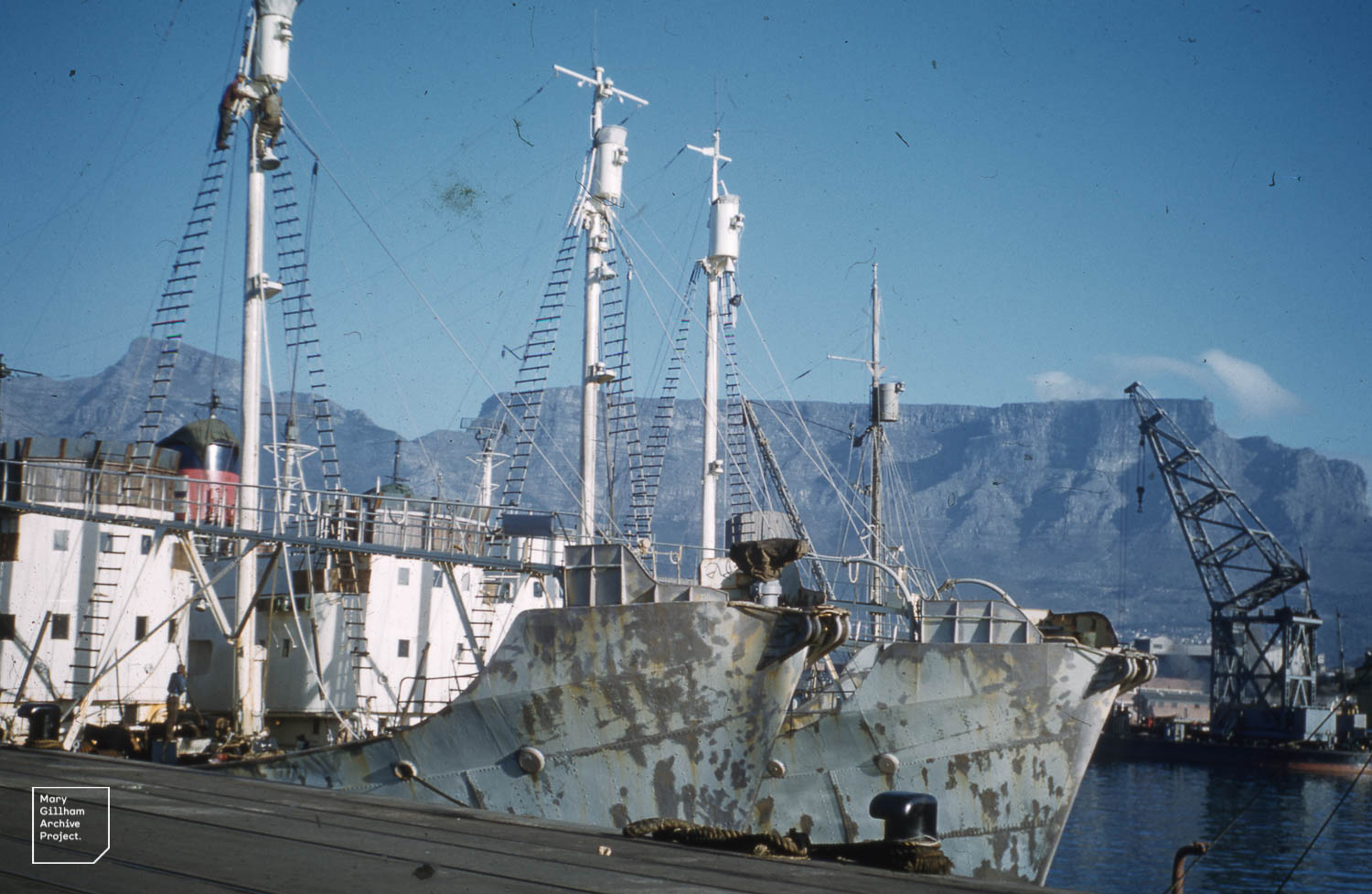
Norwegian whalers near Table Bay

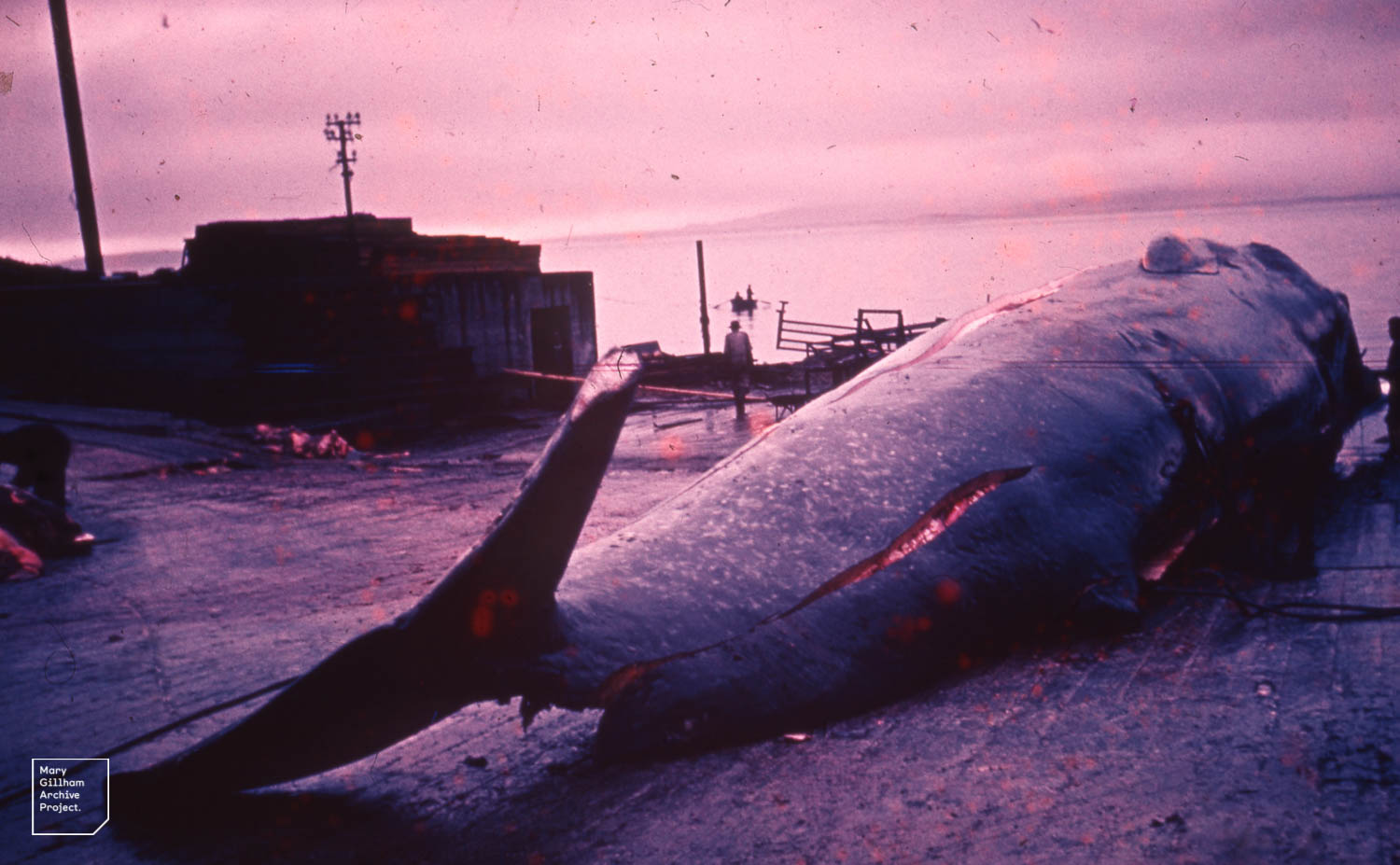
Fin whale trail flukes shortened for easier transport

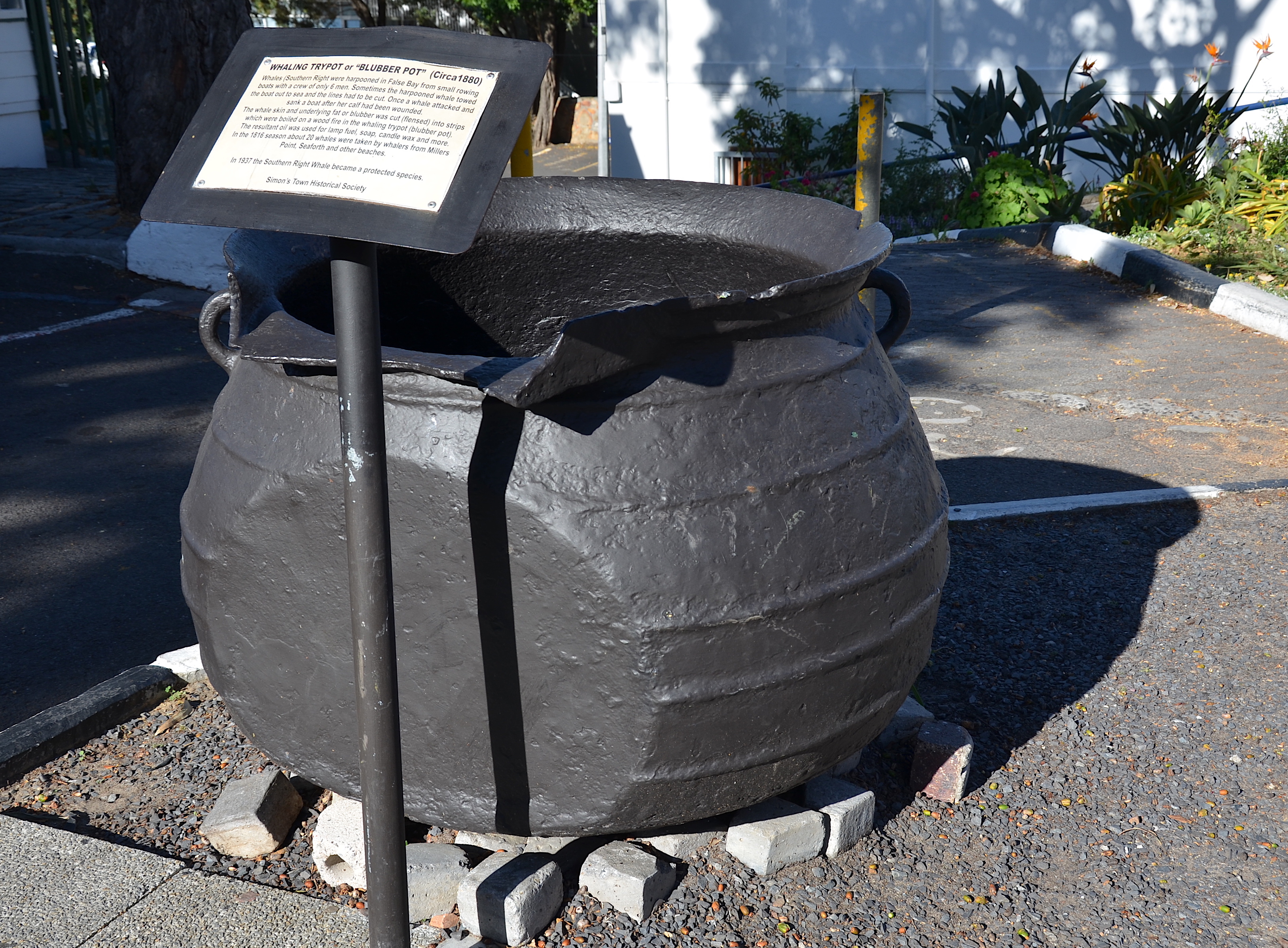
Whaling try pot in Simon's Town
