= Við Áir =

- Abandoned village
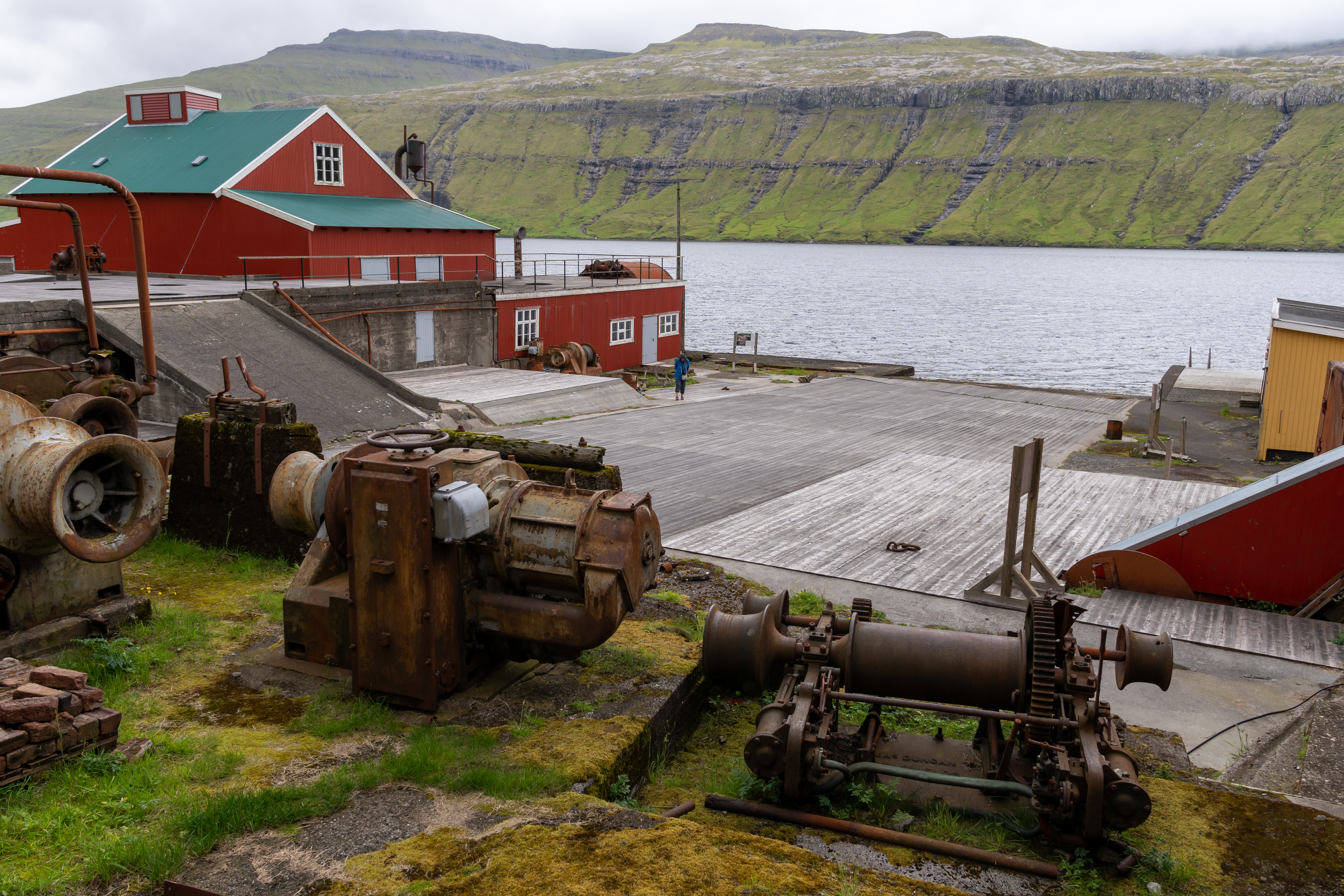
- The abandoned whaling station Við Áir

- Location in the Faroe Islands
- Coordinates: 62°10′23.9″N 6°58′22.0″W
- State: Kingdom of Denmark
- Constituent country: Faroe Islands
- Island: Streymoy
- Municipality: Sunda

Population
  - Total: none
- Time zone: GMT
  - Summer (DST): UTC+1 (EST)

Við Áir (Faroese pronunciation: [viː ˈaiːjiɹ]) is a former whaling station on the east coast of Streymoy in the Faroe Islands, near the village Hvalvík.

Við Áir means "by rivers" (á means "river" or "flood"; áir is the plural form).

== Whaling station ==
The whaling station Við Áir, was the last of seven whaling stations to be built in the Faroes, it was built in 1905 and run by the Norwegian company Chr. Salvesen & Co until 1930. They were not unknown in the Faroes, as they had already in 1897 put money into the station in Norðdepil.

It is the last of its kind in the Northern Hemisphere, two others remain in the Southern Hemisphere, in Albany, Australia and in Grytviken, South Georgia, out of a total of 214 such whaling stations worldwide built by Norwegians, only these three remain.

In 1936 it was taken over by the Faroese company P/F Sperm, and was rebuilt and modernized a bit, at this point there were only two whaling stations left in the country, Við Áir and Lopra. By this time whale stocks in the North Atlantic had diminished and results were not particularly good. In their first year the two boats Falkur and Heykur only managed to shoot 17 whales for the station Við Áir.

In 1937 the hunt went better and the two boats shot 43 whales each, while a decent catch, it wasn't enough to make things run smoothly.

In 1938 P/F Sperm bought another boat Ribeira and the following years the hunt was about 100 whales pr boat, but the onset of World War II stopped all whaling activity. And the company had to sell the boat Falkur to repay loans.

During the second World War, all whaling activity stopped, only to resume in 1945.

P/F Sperm continued after the war, but whale stocks had by now diminished so much that it was hard to make the economy work. The company went bankrupt in 1952. And the bank Sjóvinnubankin took over ownership of the station.

The company Heykur rented the station in the period 1952-1954 after which the company Partafelagið Hvalarakstur rented it until 1958. The station stopped producing whale oil with export in mind in 1958.

During 1959-1961 no activity was at the station and some boats were sold.

1962 the company Treyst rented the station and the whaling boat Sumba, Sumba lay still for a large part of the time due to repairs. But it was still managed to produce 300 tonnes of whale meat in the period 1962-1966. Treyst tried again in the season 1968 with a new boat Heykur, but now it was a reality that there were too few whales left to run commercial whaling in the old way.

In 1979 the boat Hvítiklettur got permission to shoot occasional fin whales, to start with they were only allowed to shoot one in every ten sighted, and the catch in 1979 was 11 fin whales. Later they were only allowed to shoot three whales annually and the last years only one, the last fin whale was shot in 1986.

A total of 4.454 whales came in at the station in the period 1906-1984 3.155 Fin whales, 524 Sperm whales, 509 Sei whales, 124 Minke whales, 62 Blue whales, 30 humpback whales and 410 unlisted whales.

The last activity at the station was 26 November 2013, when a stranded Sperm Whale was hauled up and then subsequently exploded after being cut into, the incident was filmed and quickly went viral on the internet

In 1989, the National Museum, determined that the station had historical importance and the same year it was decided to preserve the station. The following years a single caretaker was assigned to make emergency maintenance work on the buildings. In 1997 an assessment was made regarding how the preservation work should go ahead, without anything really being done on location. In 2008, a group of people were chosen by the Faroese government to deliver a "Provisional report on the conservation of the whaling station as a maritime museum", which is available in English too.

In the autumn 2011 the station was opened for the public, and some 500 people visited the station. Preservation work and construction of the museum remains to be completed.

== School ==
There is a school at Við Áir. The school is called Dugni; it is for young people and adults who have a disability, have psychological or sociological problems. They can get a shorter education there, 9th or 10th degree from the public school or the Danish education which is called HFS, which prepares them for an education in the service industry or working in an office. The students can live on the school while they attend the school; they can also live elsewhere.
