= Flintholmen =

Island in Svalbard, Norway

Coordinates: 78.6450°N 14.5835°E

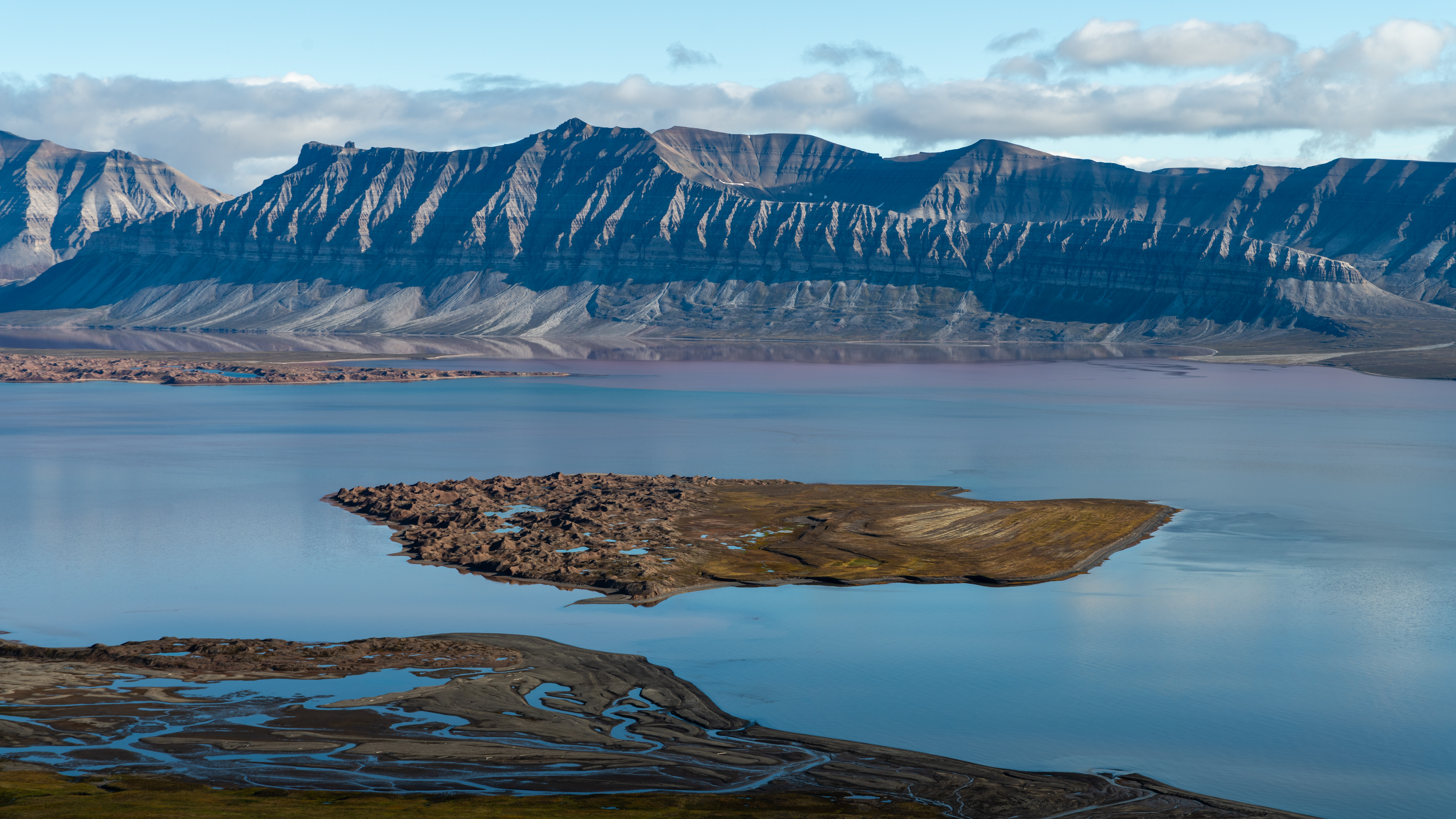
Flintholmen in 2023

Flintholmen is a small island in Ekmanfjorden in James I Land at Spitsbergen, Svalbard, at the northern side of Isfjorden. Associated with the islet is a wide shoal area with depths between zero and three meters, with an extension of about one nautical mile. Part of Flintholmen and the nearby island of Coraholmen are dominated by moraine ridges deposited by the glacier Sefströmbreen during a surge in 1896. Ekmanfjorden and its islands are included in the Nordre Isfjorden National Park.
