= Kjerulf =

Kjerulf (Kjærulf, Kjærulff, Kierulff, Kierulf, Kiærulff, Kiærulf, Kærulf or Kjaerulf) is a Danish surname. Notable people with the surname include:

People

- Axel Kjerulf (1884–1964), Danish composer
- Charles Kjerulf (1858–1919), Danish composer
- Halfdan Kjerulf (1815–1868), Norwegian composer
- Theodor Kjerulf (1825–1888), Norwegian geologist

Places

- Kjerulf Fjord, NE Greenland
- Kjerulf Glacier, South Georgia
- Kjerulfbreen, Svalbard
- Kjerulf Glacier (Jan Mayen), Jan Mayen
- Kjerulføya, island in Svalbard
