= Sefströmbreen =

Glacier in James I Land at Spitsbergen, Svalbard

- Location: James I Land, Spitsbergen
- Coordinates: 78°43′36″N 14°10′44″E
- Area: 45 square kilometres (17 sq mi)
- Length: 15 kilometres (9.3 mi)
- Status: Tidewater glacier (Debouching into Ekmanfjorden)

Sefströmbreen is a glacier in James I Land at Spitsbergen, Svalbard. It is debouching into Ekmanfjorden at the northern side of Isfjorden. The glacier is named after Nils Gabriel Sefström. During a surge in 1896 the glacier deposited large moraine ridges in the inner part of the fjord, and these can be seen at the islands of Coraholmen and Flintholmen. Sefströmbreen is included in the Nordre Isfjorden National Park.

== See also ==
- Sefströmkammen
