= Mediumfjellet =

Mountain northwest of Yoldiabukta in Oscar II Land at Spitsbergen, Svalbard

Coordinates: 78.5200°N 14.1737°E

Mediumfjellet is a mountain northwest of Yoldiabukta in Oscar II Land at Spitsbergen, Svalbard. It constitutes the southern part of the ridge Jämtlandryggen, and has several peaks and a length of 8 kilometers (5.0 mi). The highest peak is Gavltinden to the north. The mountain is located between the glaciers Sveabreen and Wahlenbergbreen.
