= Muslingodden =

Headland in Spitsbergen, Svalbard

Coordinates: 78.5132°N 14.4205°E

- Interactive map of Muslingodden

Geography
- Location: Oscar II Land, Spitsbergen, Svalbard, Norway
- Area: 1.5 km^{2} (0.58 sq mi)

Administration
- Norway

Muslingodden is a headland in Svalbard, Norway.

== Geography ==
Muslingodden is located at the western side of Nordfjorden in Oscar II Land on the island Spitsbergen in Svalbard. It has a length of about 1.5 kilometers, and was formed by the moraine of the glacier Sveabreen. The bay Yoldiabukta is located south of Muslingodden. The Wahlenbergbreen glacier is located a few kilometers northeast. It debouches into Yoldiabukta.

== History ==
In 2016, world renowned Italian pianist and composer Ludovico Einaudi performed one of his compositions, Elegy for the Arctic, aboard a floating platform just off the coast of Muslingodden in Nordfjorden. Speaking about the performance, Einaudi remarked, “Being here has been a great experience. I could see the purity and fragility of this area with my own eyes and interpret a song I wrote to be played upon the best stage in the world. It is important that we understand the importance of the Arctic, stop the process of destruction and protect it."
