= Coraholmen =

Island in Svalbard, Norway

Coordinates: 78.6827°N 14.7097°E

Coraholmen is an island in Ekmanfjorden in James I Land at Spitsbergen, Svalbard, at the northern side of Isfjorden. It has a length of 3.3 kilometers, and a width of 1.8 kilometers. The island is named after the fossil species Productus cora, which is common on the island. Part of the island is dominated by moraine ridges deposited by the glacier Sefströmbreen during a surge in 1896. Coraholmen is included in the Nordre Isfjorden National Park.
