= Lovénvatnet =

Lake at Spitsbergen, Svalbard

- Location in Svalbard
- Location: Oscar II Land at Spitsbergen, Svalbard
- Coordinates: 78.2835°N 13.7492°E
- Type: natural freshwater lake
- Basin countries: Norway

Lovénvatnet is a lake in Oscar II Land at Spitsbergen, Svalbard. The lake is named after Swedish zoologist Sven Ludvig Lovén. It is located between the mountain ridges of Värmlandryggen and Geologryggen.

== See also ==
- Lovénberget
