= Stugunfjellet =

Mountain in Oscar II Land at Spitsbergen, Svalbard

Coordinates: 78.5987°N 13.9479°E

Stugunfjellet is a mountain in Oscar II Land at Spitsbergen, Svalbard. It has an altitude of 684 metres, and is located on the ridge of Jämtlandryggen, between Frösöfjellet and Ragundafjellet. It is named after the Swedish parish of Stugun.
