= Helsinglandryggen =

Mountain ridge in Oscar II Land at Spitsbergen, Svalbard

Coordinates: 78.4653°N 14.0221°E

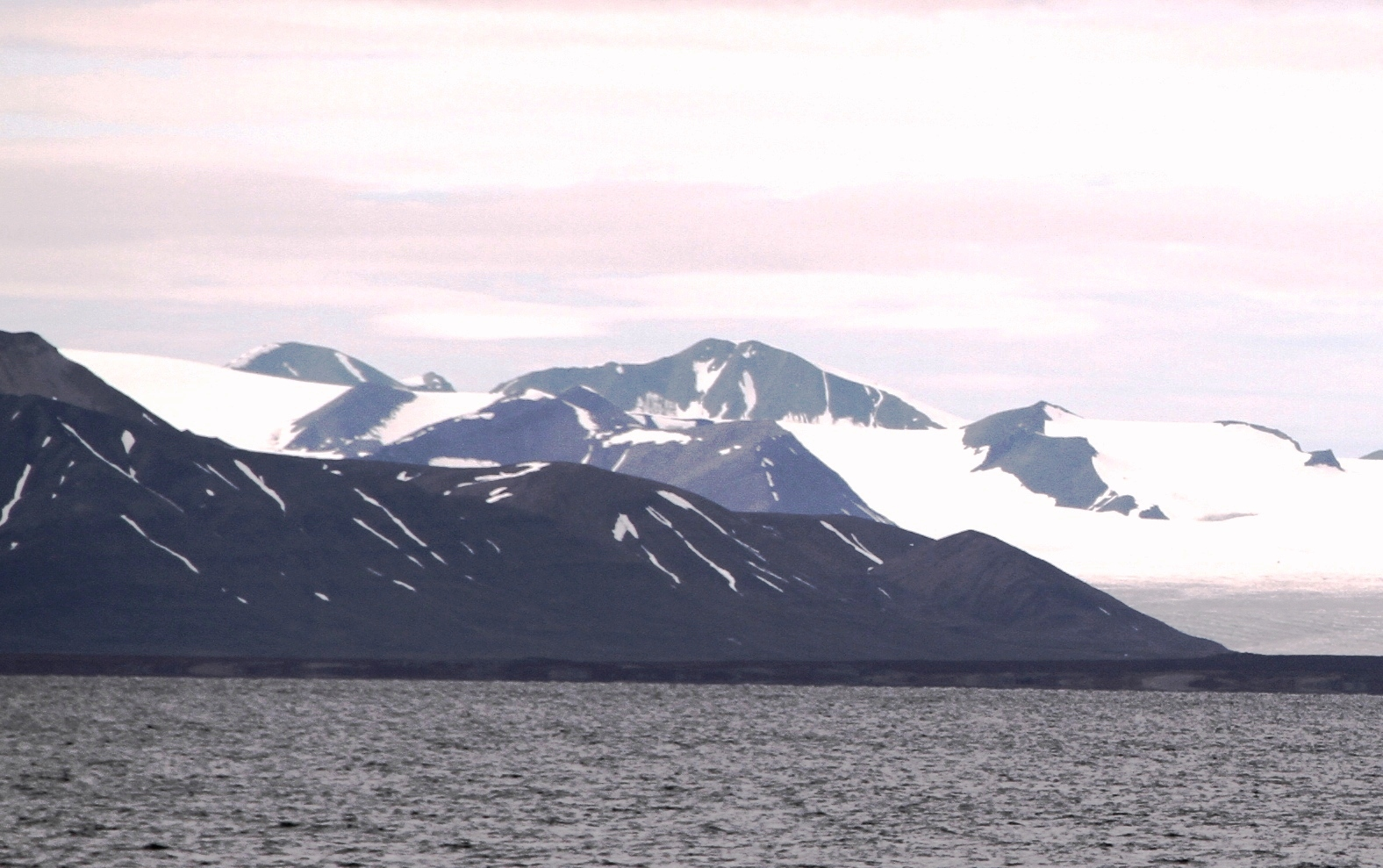
Image from the southeast (Isfjorden) towards northwest and the coast of Oscar II Land, central-western Spitsbergen

Helsinglandryggen is a mountain ridge in Oscar II Land at Spitsbergen, Svalbard. The ridge has a length of about 16 kilometers. It is located at the northwestern side of Isfjorden, between Wahlenbergbreen and Borebreen. Among the summits at the ridge are Kaosfjellet, Gaffelen, Mehøgda, Kvævefjellet and Syltoppen.
