= Värmlandryggen =

Coordinates: 78.2675°N 13.8455°E

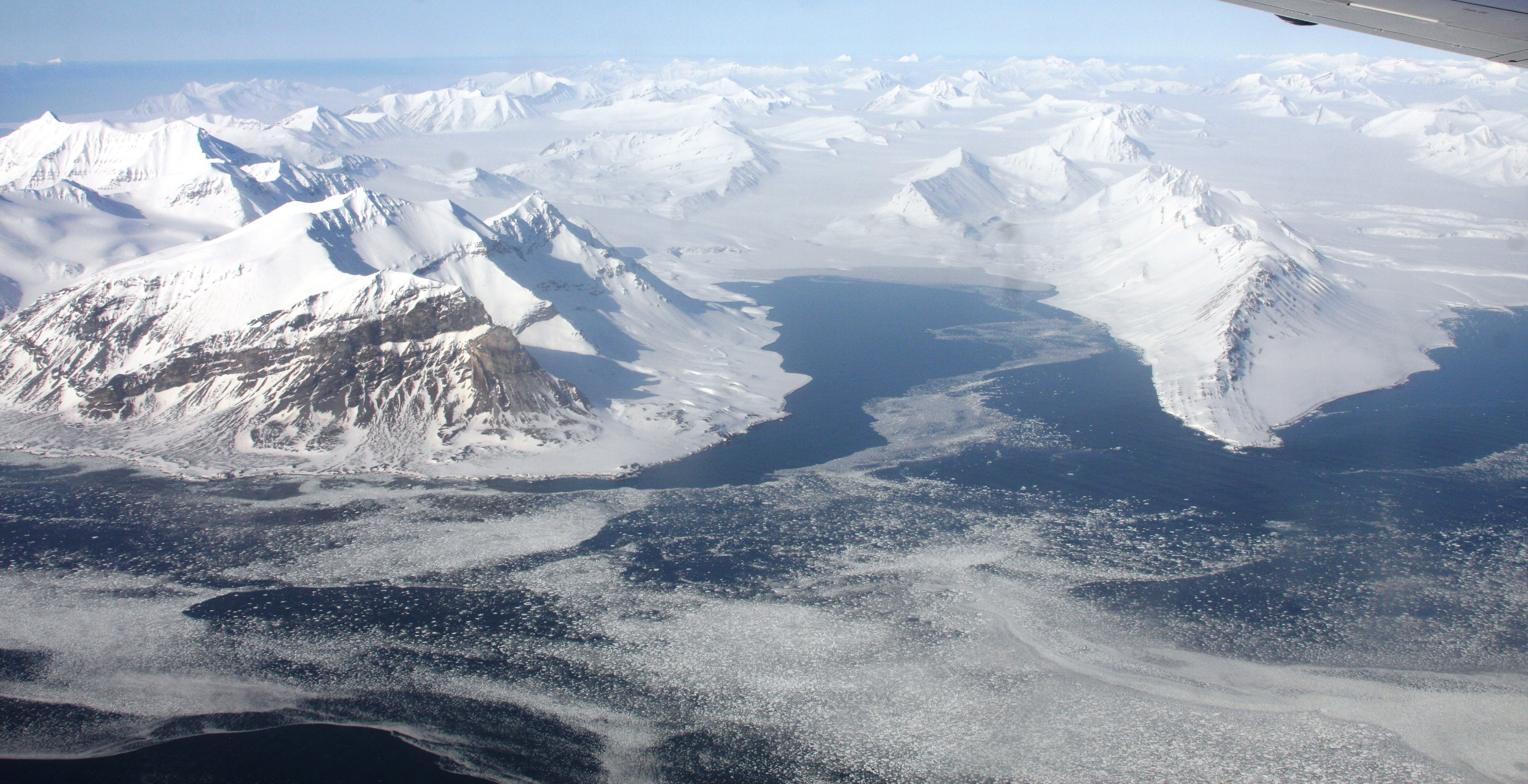
Trygghamna, with Protektorfjellet to the left and Värmlandryggen to the right

Värmlandryggen is a mountain ridge in Oscar II Land at Spitsbergen, Svalbard. The ridge has a length of about nine kilometers, and is located at the northern side of Isfjorden, east of Trygghamna and Lovénvatnet, and west of Ymerbukta.The ridge includes the mountains Klaratoppen, Hovtinden, Karlstadtoppen and Svenskegga.
