= Geologryggen =

Mountain ridge in Svalbard, Norway

Coordinates: 78.2965°N 13.7036°E

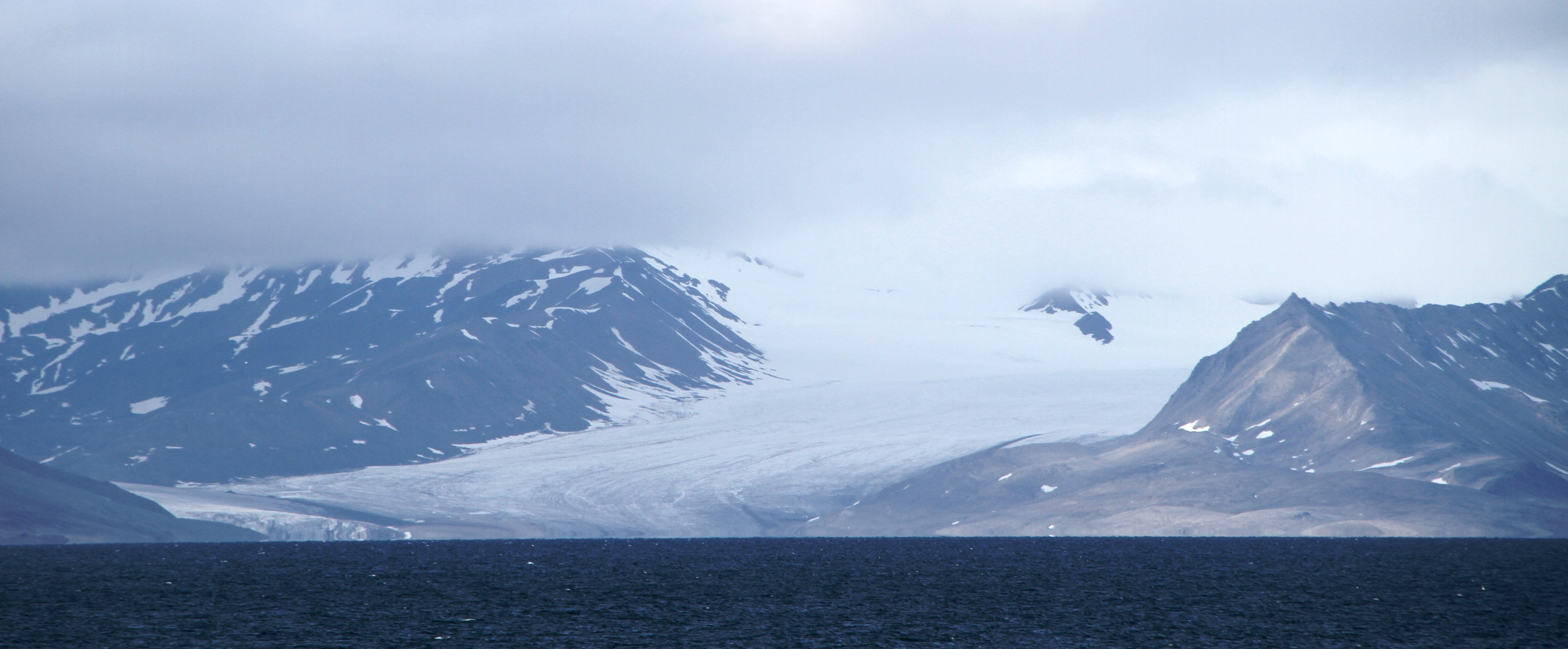

Geologryggen is a mountain ridge in Oscar II Land at Spitsbergen, Svalbard. The ridge has a length of about four kilometers, and is located between Kjerulfbreen and Esmarkbreen. Geologryggen is included in the Nordre Isfjorden National Park.
