= Borebukta =

Bay in Oscar II Land at Spitsbergen, Svalbard

Coordinates: 78.3856°N 14.2474°E

Borebukta is a bay in Oscar II Land at Spitsbergen, Svalbard. It is located at the northwestern side of Isfjorden, west of Bohemanflya, and has a width of about 4.5 kilometers. The glacier Borebreen debouches into the bay. Also the Nansenbreen glacier debouches into Borebukta.
