= Årefjellet =

Mountain in Spitsbergen, Norway

Coordinates: 78.6656°N 13.5648°E

- Location within Svalbard

Highest point
- Elevation: 882 m (2,894 ft)

Naming
- Language of name: Norwegian Nynorsk

Årefjellet is a mountain in Oscar II Land on the island of Spitsbergen, Svalbard. It has a maximum elevation of 882 m, and is located at the northern part of the ridge Jämtlandryggen. It borders to the glaciers Sveabreen and Wahlenbergbreen.
