= Ymerbukta =

Bay in Svalbard, Norway

Coordinates: 78°16′03″N 13°59′02″E

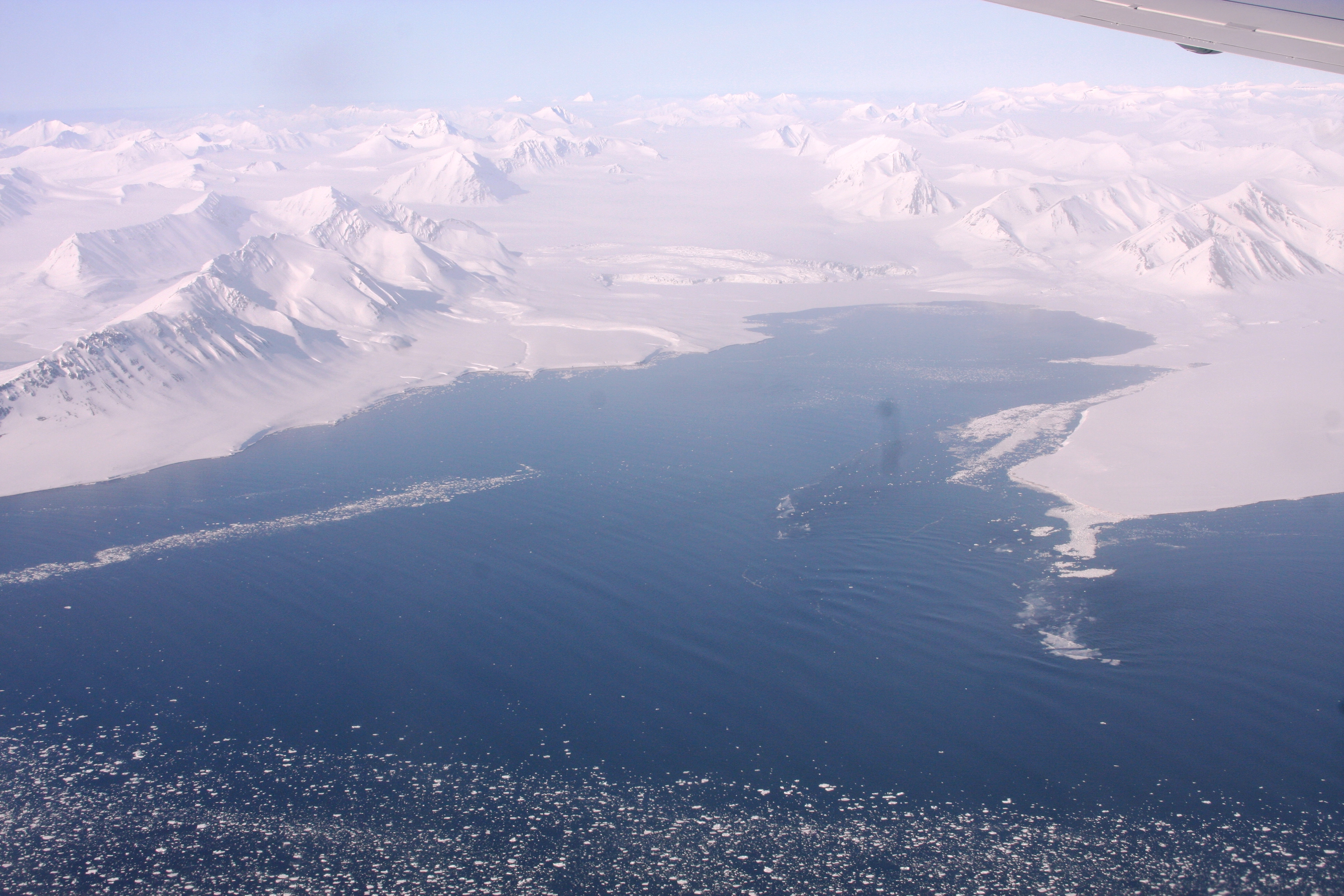
Ymerbukta, with Värmlandryggen to the left

Ymerbukta is a bay in Oscar II Land at Spitsbergen, Svalbard. The glacier Esmarkbreen debouches into the bay. It is about 6 kilometres (3.7 mi) long, located at the northern side of Isfjorden. The bay is separated from Trygghamna by the mountain chain Värmlandryggen.

Ymerbukta is part of the larger Isfjorden system, one of the principal fjords of western Spitsbergen. The bay is characterized by Arctic tundra landscapes and glacially carved terrain, with Esmarkbreen being one of several tidewater glaciers in the region. Due to its relatively accessible location near Longyearbyen, Ymerbukta is occasionally visited for scientific research and Arctic tourism activities such as glacier observation and hiking. The surrounding area is sparsely populated and falls within the Svalbard environmental protection framework, which regulates human activity to preserve fragile Arctic ecosystems.
