= Hovtinden =

Mountain in Svalbard, Norway

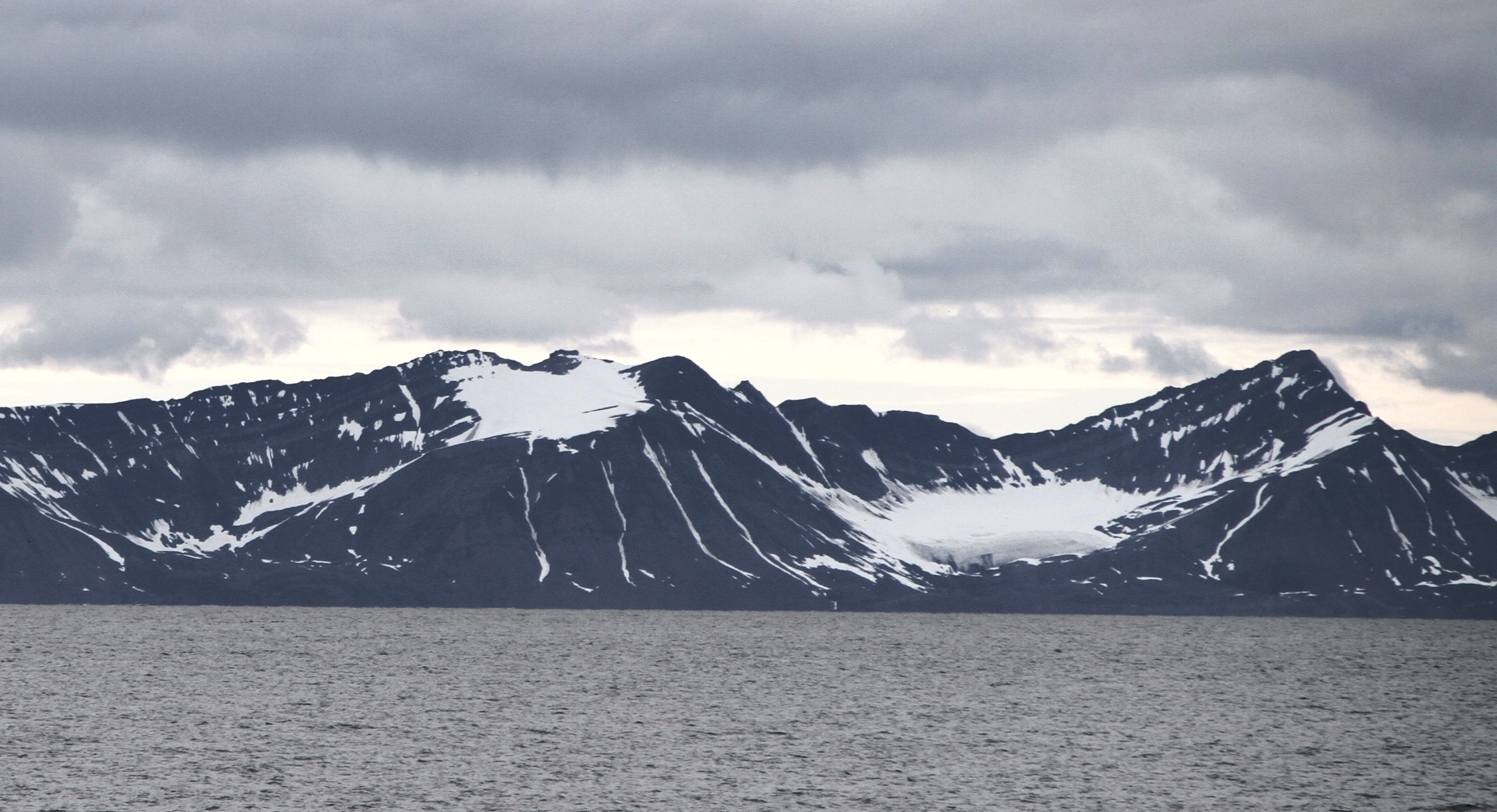
- Hovtinden (the rightmost peak) is the highest point on the ridge of Värmlandryggen.

Highest point
- Elevation: 575 m (1,886 ft)
- Coordinates: 78.2856°N 13.8077°E

Geography
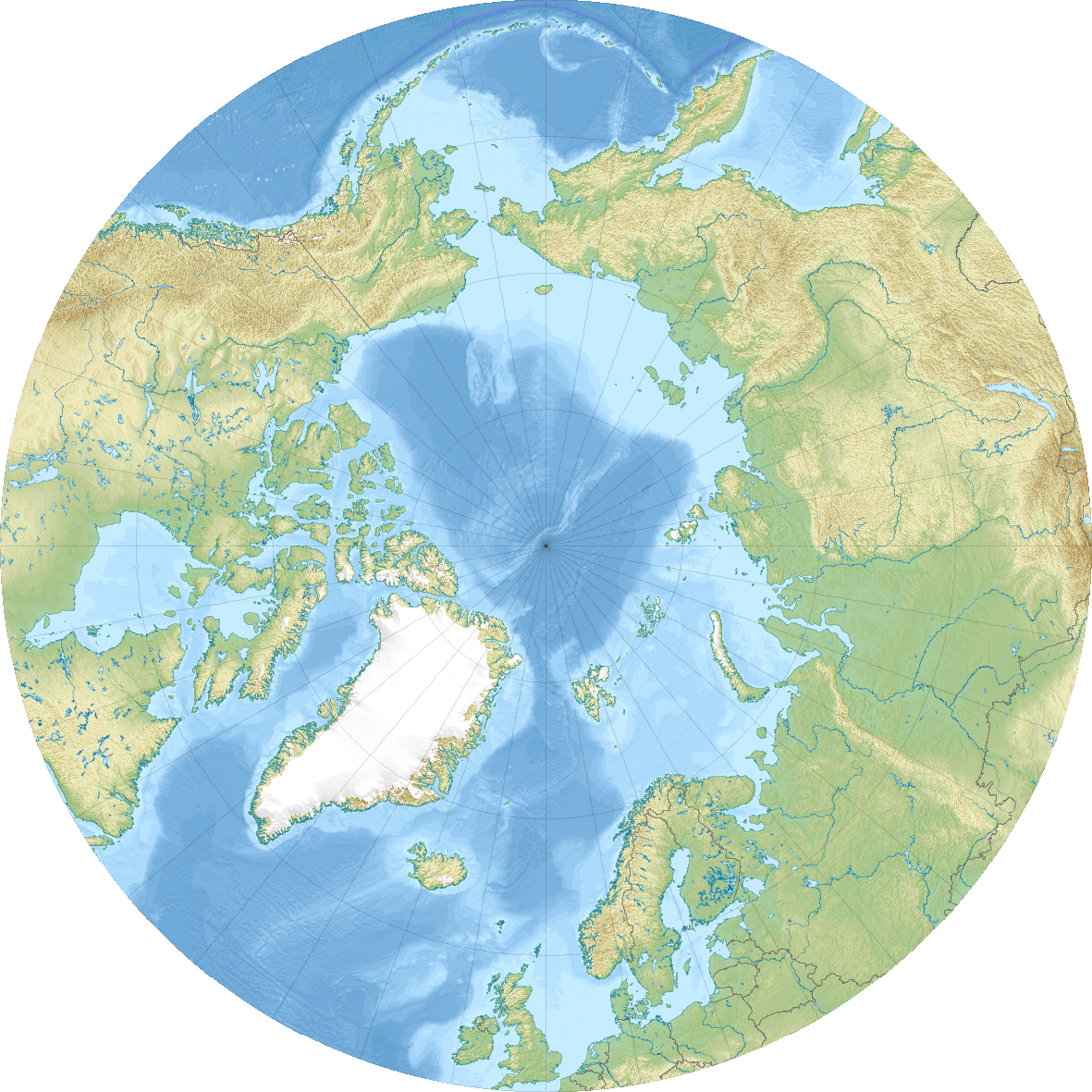
- Location within Arctic
- Location: Oscar II Land at Spitsbergen, Svalbard, Norway

Hovtinden is a mountain in Oscar II Land at Spitsbergen, Svalbard. It has a height of 575 m.a.s.l. and is located on the ridge of Värmlandryggen. Other peaks along the ridge are Klaratoppen, Karlstadtoppen and Svenskegga.
