= Bohemanflya =

Peninsula in Oscar II Land on Spitsbergen, Svalbard

Coordinates: 78°25′03″N 14°28′38″E

Bohemanflya ("Boheman peninsula") is a peninsula on the northwestern side of Isfjorden, in Oscar II Land on Spitsbergen, Svalbard. It is named after Swedish entomologist Carl Henrik Boheman. The peninsula has a length of about 14 km (8.7 mi) and a width of 8 km (5.0 mi), bounded by Yoldiabukta and Borebukta. The Boheman Bird Sanctuary is located south of the peninsula. The southeastern spit on the peninsula is named Bohemanneset.

A claim of the coal reserves of Bohemanflya was delivered in 1899. The claim covers about 68.4 km^{2} (26.4 sq mi).
