= Nansenbreen =

Glacier at Spitsbergen, Norway

Coordinates: 78.3761°N 13.8976°E

Nansenbreen is a glacier in Oscar II Land at Spitsbergen, Svalbard. It has a length of about fourteen kilometers and is located west of Gestriklandkammen at the northwestern side of Isfjorden, debouching into the bay of Borebukta. It is named after Arctic explorer Fridtjof Nansen. The glacier exhibited a significant surge of about two kilometers in 1946, and has since gradually retreated.
