= Alkhornet =

Mountain in Spitsbergen, Norway

Coordinates: 78°13′N 13°45′E

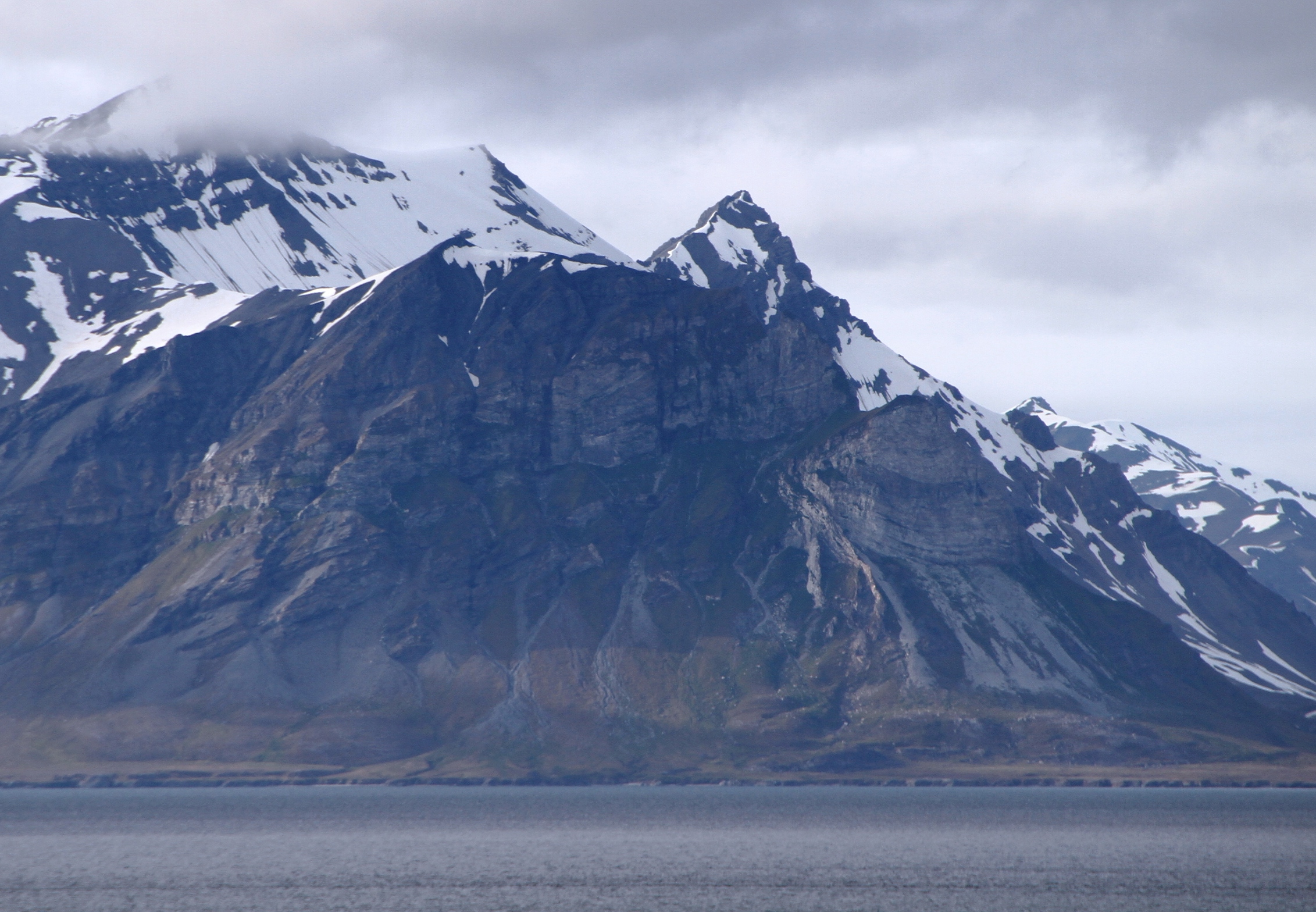

Alkhornet is a mountain on the western coast of Spitsbergen, the largest island of Norway’s arctic Svalbard archipelago. It is 428 m in height and stands in southern Oscar II Land on the northern side of the entrance to the inlet of Isfjorden near the bay of Trygghamna. It has been identified as an Important Bird Area (IBA) by BirdLife International because its cliffs support about 10,000 breeding pairs of seabirds. The cliffs are composed of metamorphosed carbonate rock, over a billion years old. The moss tundra below the cliffs receives nutrients from the seabird colonies and is lush in places, providing grazing grounds for reindeer, nesting places for geese and denning sites for Arctic foxes.
