= Dicksonfjorden =

Fjord in Svalbard, Norway

Coordinates: 78°43′21″N 15°20′50″E

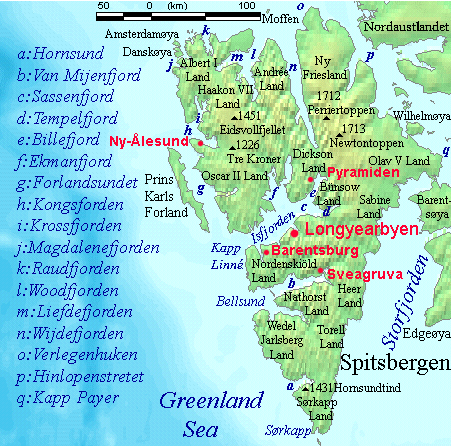
Dicksonfjorden is a branch of Isfjorden.

Dicksonfjorden is a fjord branch of Isfjorden at Spitsbergen, Svalbard. It is located between James I Land and Dickson Land, and is named after Swedish Baron Oscar Dickson.
