= Svenskane =

Mountain in Svalbard

Coordinates: 78.6481°N 13.6509°E

Svenskane is the name of three peaks of the ridge Jämtlandryggen in Oscar II Land at Spitsbergen, Svalbard. The peaks have altitudes of 963, 906 and 837 meters. Svenskane are located south of Årefjellet and north of Bydalsfjellet.
