= Gestriklandkammen =

Mountain range in Svalbard, Norway

Coordinates: 78.3970°N 13.8644°E

Gestriklandkammen is a mountain range in Oscar II Land at Spitsbergen, Svalbard. It has a length of about eleven kilometers and is located between the glaciers of Borebreen and Nansenbreen. It is named after the Swedish district of Gästrikland. Among the mountains in the range are Skonrokken, Kavringen, Vesleskrømtet, Kamhøgda and Krymleskuten.
