= Bydalsfjellet =

Mountain in Spitsbergen, Norway

Coordinates: 78.6327°N 13.7167°E

Bydalsfjellet is a mountain in Oscar II Land at Spitsbergen, Svalbard. It has an altitude of 867 metres, and is located on the ridge of Jämtlandryggen, between Svenskane and Frösöfjellet.
