= Borebreen =

Glacier in Oscar II Land at Spitsbergen, Svalbard

Coordinates: 78.4421°N 13.8811°E

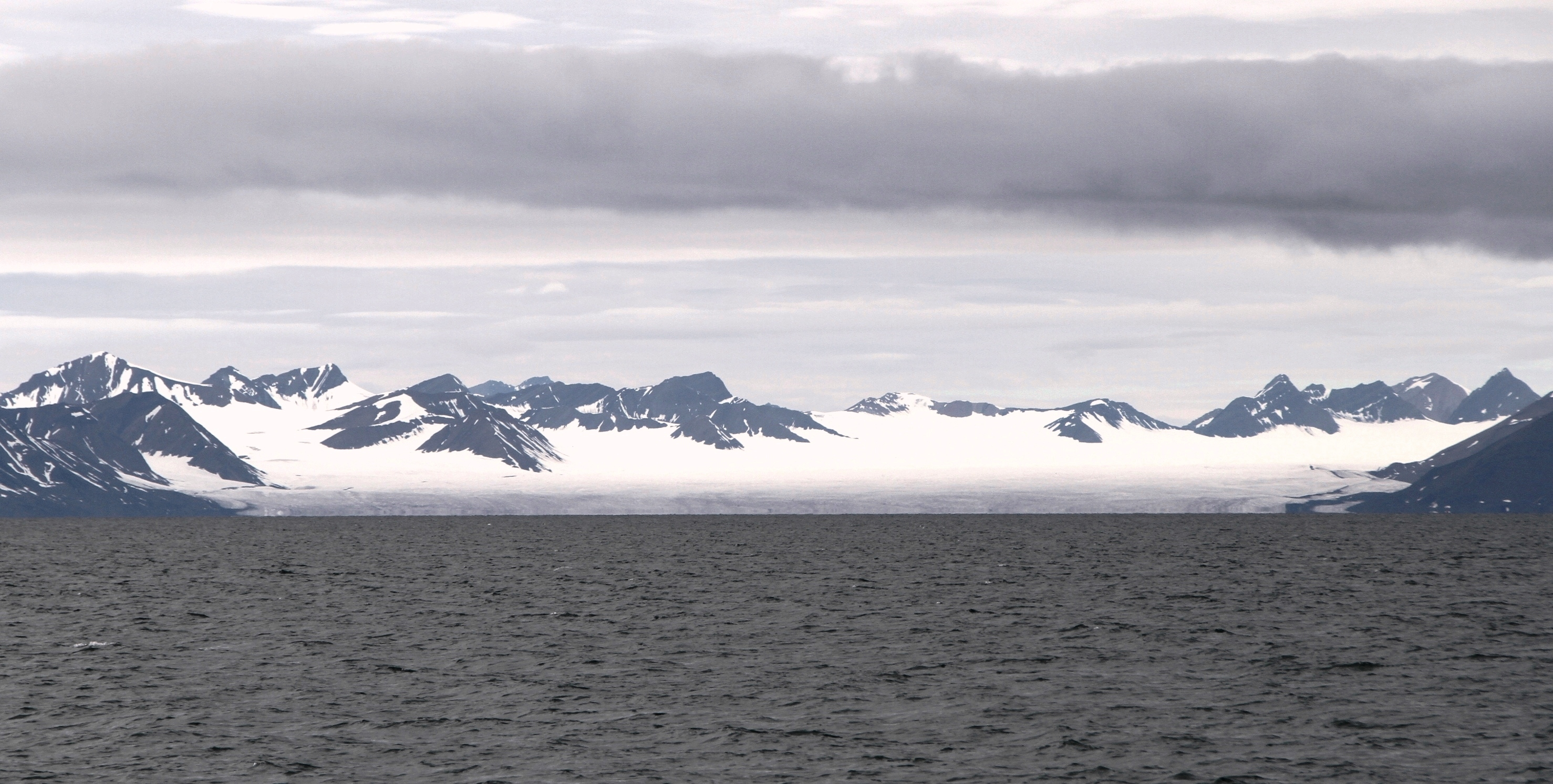
Borebreen

Borebreen is a glacier in Oscar II Land at Spitsbergen, Svalbard. The glacier has a length of about 22 kilometers. It is located at the northwestern side of Isfjorden, west of Helsinglandryggen, flowing towards Borebukta.
