= Ragundafjellet =

Mountain in Oscar II Land at Spitsbergen, Svalbard

Coordinates: 78.5875°N 13.9965°E

Ragundafjellet is a mountain in Oscar II Land at Spitsbergen, Svalbard. It has an altitude of 790 metres, and is located on the ridge of Jämtlandryggen, between Triryggtoppen and Stugunfjellet. It is named after the Swedish district of Ragunda.
