= Sven Ludvig Lovén =

Swedish marine zoologist and malacologist

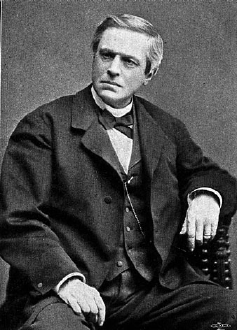
- Born: 6 January 1809; Stockholm, Sweden
- Died: 3 September 1895 (aged 86); Solna parish, Sweden
- Education: Lund University
- Scientific career
- Fields: marine zoologist malacologist
- Workplaces: Stockholm University

Prof Sven Ludvig Lovén (6 January 1809 – 3 September 1895), was a Swedish marine zoologist and malacologist. The Sven Lovén Centre for Marine Sciences within the University of Gothenburg was named in his honour.

== Life ==
Lovén was born in Stockholm, Sweden. He studied at Uppsala University in 1823, and enrolled at Lund University in 1824. He completed his studies with a Magister degree in 1829. The following year, he was appointed associate professor of zoology at Lund University. During the years 1830–1831, Lovén traveled to Berlin where he studied anatomy and microscopy techniques under the guidance of Christian Gottfried Ehrenberg (1795–1876) and Karl Rudolphi (1771–1832) at Humboldt University of Berlin.

He made scientific journeys in the early 1830s along the Swedish west coast. During 1836–1837, he made a trip to Finnmark in northern Norway and to Spitsbergen. In 1840, Lovén was elected a member of the Swedish Royal Academy of Sciences. In 1841, he was appointed professor and curator at the Swedish Museum of Natural History invertebrate department, a position he came to hold until 1892. He was also professor of Natural History at Stockholm University. Between 1870 and 1892, Lovén devoted most of his scientific work to echinoderms, mainly sea urchins. Lovén founded Kristinebergs Marina Research Station at Fiskebäckskil on the island of Skaftö in 1877.

== Recognition ==
In 1871, Lovén was made an external member of the Bavarian Academy of Sciences and Humanities, in 1872 as a corresponding member of the French Academy of Sciences and in 1875 a member of the Prussian Academy of Sciences. He was made an honorary Fellow of the Royal Society of Edinburgh in 1881 and a Foreign Fellow of the Royal Society of London in 1885. He was admitted into the Göttingen Academy of Sciences and Humanities in 1886.

In 1909, the Royal Academy of Sciences established the Sven Lovén Memorial Fund, which awards the Lovén Medal (Lovénska medaljen).

Several geographical locations at Svalbard are named after him. These include the headland Kapp Lovén at Nordaustlandet, the mountain Lovénberget in Ny-Friesland on Spitsbergen, the lake Lovénvatnet in Oscar II Land, and the glaciers Lovénbreane at Brøggerhalvøya.

== Biological references ==
The World Register of Marine Species (WoRMS) lists 174 marine species named by Lovén. Many of these have become synonyms. Two species he named, the hydrozoan Lovenella clausa (Lovenellidae) and the crustacean Lovenula falcifera (now Paradiaptomus), were in genera named after him by other zoologists.
