= Nordfjorden (Svalbard) =

Fjord in Svalbard, Norway

Coordinates: 78.5044°N 14.7516°E

Nordfjorden is a northern branch of the fjord Isfjorden at Spitsbergen, Svalbard. It is located between Bohemanneset and Kapp Thordsen, and branches further into the fjords Ekmanfjorden and Dicksonfjorden. The 30 kilometer long glacier Sveabreen debouches into the fjord.
