= Bohemanneset =

Headland in Spitsbergen, Svalbard

Coordinates: 78°22′30″N 14°47′00″E

Bohemanneset (English: "Cape Boheman") is a cape defined by the southeastern spit of Bohemanflya, located at the northwestern side of Isfjorden, in Oscar II Land on Spitsbergen, Svalbard. It is named after Swedish entomologist Carl Henrik Boheman. Bohemanneset has a length of about 2 km (1.2 mi). Older names are Cap Boheman and Cape Boheman.

Polar explorers Hjalmar Johansen and Theodor Lerner spent the winter of 1907/1908 in a cabin at Bohemanneset.
