= Boheman Bird Sanctuary =

Protected area in Svalbard, Norway

- Interactive map of Boheman Bird Sanctuary
- Location: Spitsbergen, Svalbard, Norway
- Coordinates: 78°22.3′N 14°36.7′E
- Area: 2.076 km^{2} (0.802 sq mi)
- Established: 1973
- Governing body: Directorate for Nature Management

Boheman Bird Sanctuary (Norwegian: Boheman fuglereservat) is a bird reserve in Svalbard, Norway, established in 1973. It includes islands south of Bohemanflya in Oscar II Land. The protected area covers a total of 2,076,000 square metres.
