= Wahlenbergfjellet =

Mountain in Svalbard

Highest point
- Coordinates: 77°43′01″N 15°33′20″E

Geography
- Country: Norway
- Region: Svalbard
- District: Spitsbergen

Wahlenbergfjellet is a mountain in Nathorst Land at Spitsbergen, Svalbard. It has two peaks, with heights of 949 and 915 m.a.s.l., respectively. The mountain is located between Krylbreen, Krylen and Frysjadalen, at the southern side of Van Mijenfjorden. It is named after Swedish geographer and geologist Göran Wahlenberg.

== See also ==
- Wahlenbergfjorden
- Wahlenbergbreen
