= Protektorfjellet =

Coordinates: 78.2242°N 13.7517°E

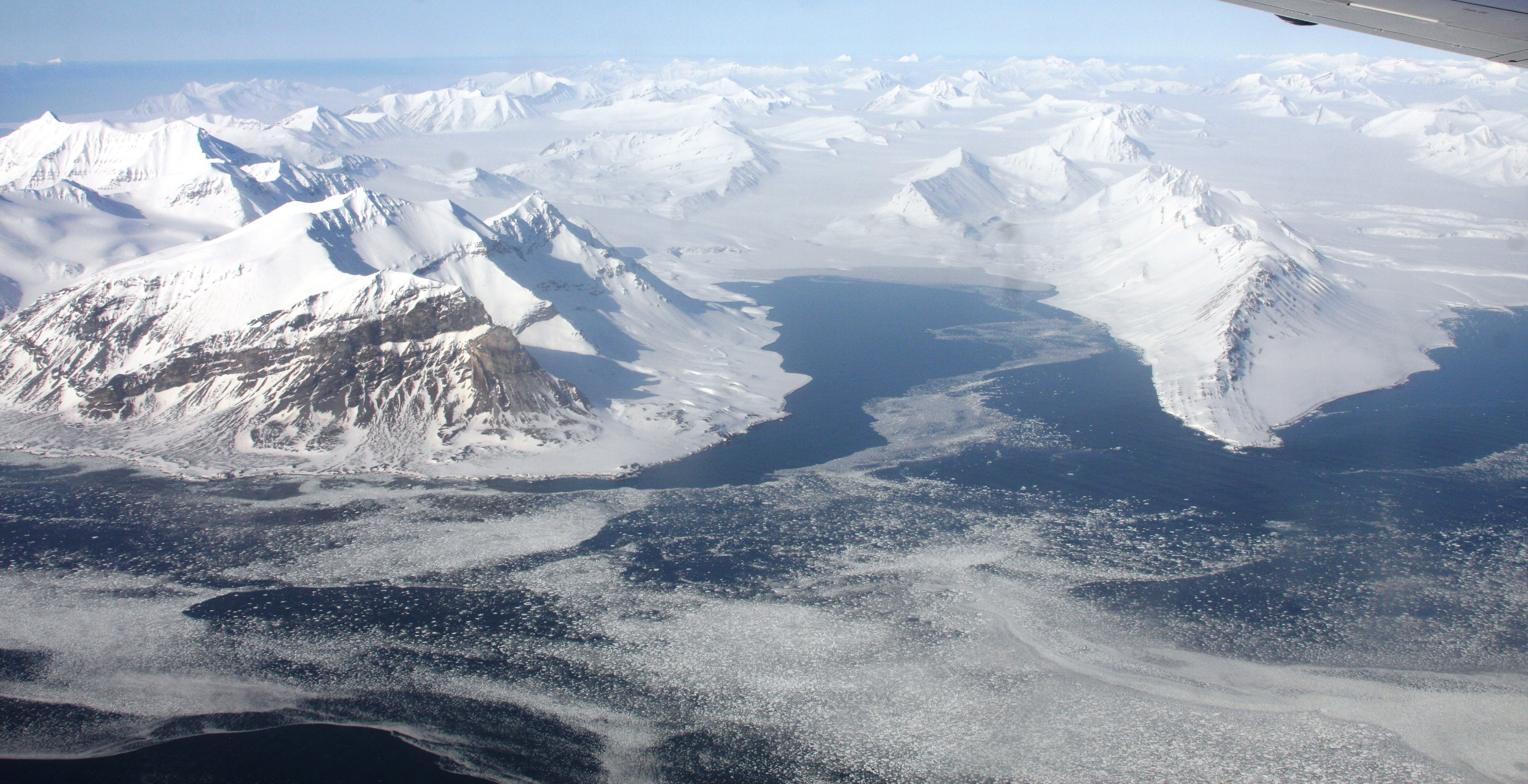
Protektorfjellet to the left, west of the bay Trygghamna.

Protektorfjellet is a mountain in Oscar II Land at Spitsbergen, Svalbard. It has a height of 847 meters, and is located west of the bay Trygghamna at the northern side of Isfjorden.
