= Sefströmkammen =

Mountain ridge in Svalbard, Norway

Coordinates: 77.836°N 14.558°E

Sefströmkammen is a mountain ridge in Nordenskiöld Land at Spitsbergen, Svalbard. It has a length of about six kilometers, extending along Aurdalen from Søre Aurdalsbre, and comprises the peak of Hamretoppen and other peaks. The ridge is named after Swedish geologist Nils Gabriel Sefström. The glacier-dammed Kamvatnet is located between Sefströmkammen and Fridtjovbreen. The lower ridge of Flathaugen is proximate to Sefströmkammen.

== See also ==
- Sefströmbreen
