= Hisingerfjellet =

Coordinates: 77°43′17″N 15°45′16″E

Hisingerfjellet is a mountain in Nathorst Land at Spitsbergen, Svalbard. It has two peaks with heights of 1,078 and 1.044 m.a.s.l., respectively. The mountain is located between Krylbreen, Krylen, Breskarvet and Bromelldalen, at the southern side of Van Mijenfjorden. It is named after Swedish geologist Wilhelm Hisinger.
