= Krylbreen =

Glacier in Svalbard, Norway

Coordinates: 77.714°N 15.670°E

Krylbreen is a glacier in Nathorst Land at Spitsbergen, Svalbard. It has a length of about four kilometers, and extends northwards from the mountain of Krylen, between the mountains of Hisingerfjellet and Wahlenbergfjellet.
