= Esmarkbreen =

Glacier in Spitsbergen, Svalbard

Coordinates: 78°22′00″N 13°42′18″E

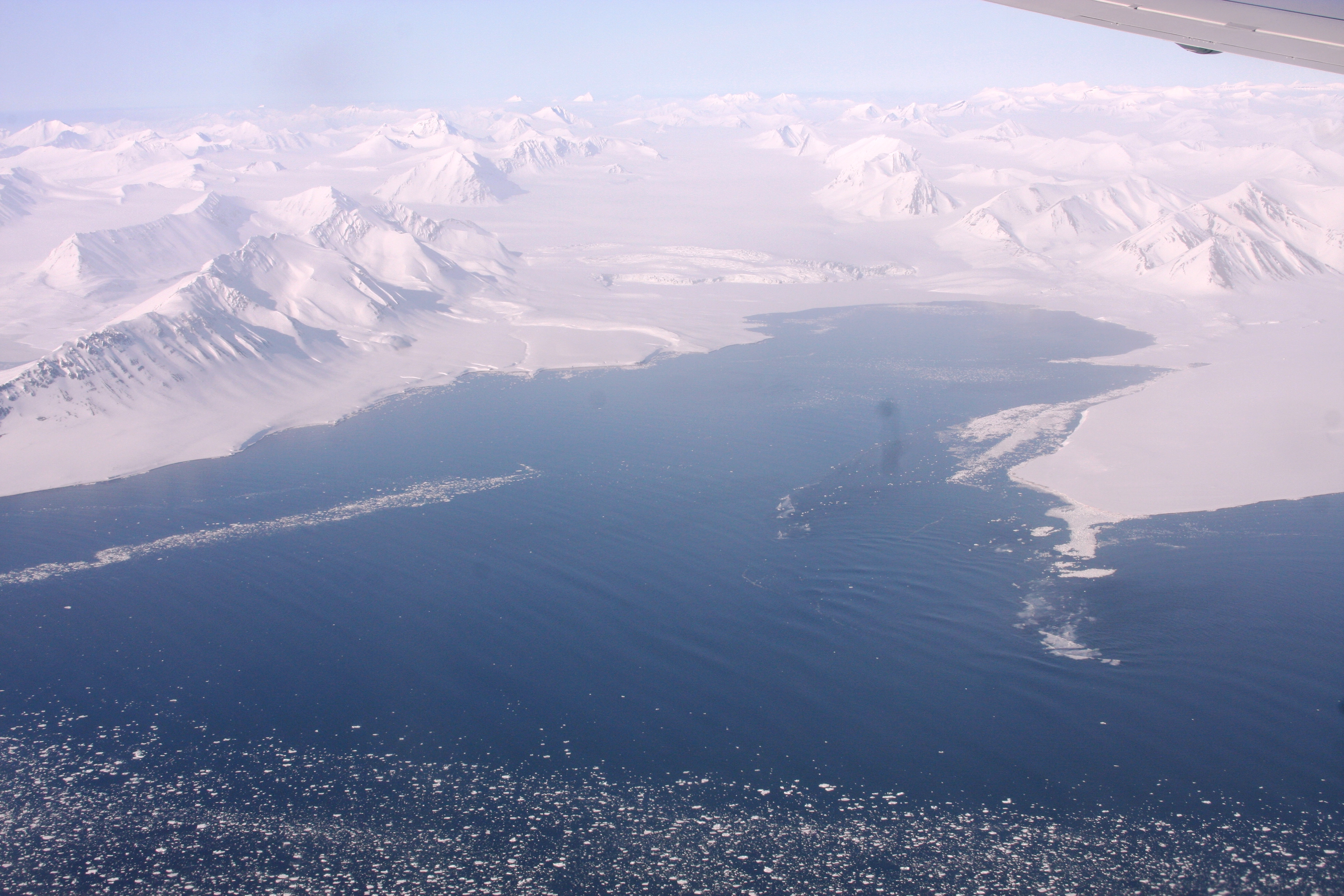
Esmarkbreen debouches into Ymerbukta.

Esmarkbreen is a glacier in Oscar II Land at Spitsbergen, Svalbard. It is named after geologist Jens Esmark. The glacier has a length of 15 kilometers, and debouches into the bay Ymerbukta at the northern side of Isfjorden.
