= Jämtlandryggen =

Mountain ridge in Oscar II Land at Spitsbergen, Svalbard

Coordinates: 78.6113°N 13.8513°E

Jämtlandryggen is a mountain ridge in Oscar II Land at Spitsbergen, Svalbard. It has a length of 26 kilometers, and comprises a number of mountains with altitudes in the range roughly between 750 and 950 meters, including Årefjellet, Svenskane, Bydalsfjellet, Frösöfjellet, Ragundafjellet, Triryggtoppen and Gavltinden (Mediumfjellet). The ridge is located between the glaciers Sveabreen and Wahlenbergbreen.
