= Kjerulfbreen =

Glacier in Svalbard, Norway

Kjerulf Glacier
- Kjerulfbreen
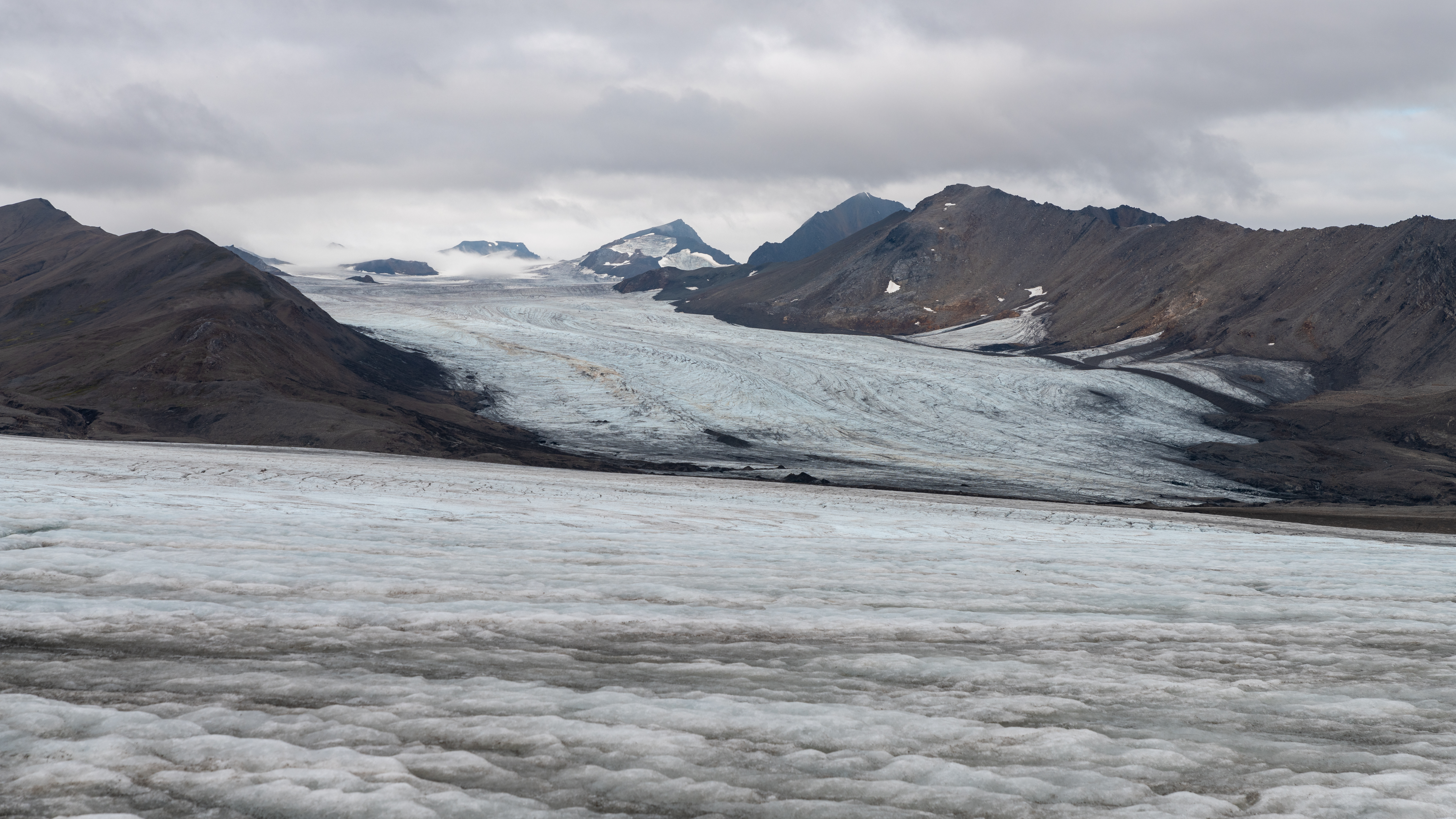

- Location within Svalbard
- Location: Oscar II Land; Spitsbergen, Svalbard
- Coordinates: 78°17′56″N 13°38′24″E
- Length: 7.5 km (4.7 mi)
- Terminus: Trygghamna, Isfjorden; Greenland Sea

Kjerulfbreen (Kjerulf Glacier) is a glacier in Oscar II Land at Spitsbergen, Svalbard. It has a length of about 7.5 kilometers, and is debouching into the Trygghamna bay at the northern side of Isfjorden. The glacier is named after Norwegian geologist Theodor Kjerulf.

== See also ==
- List of glaciers in Svalbard
