= Daudmannsøyra Important Bird Area =

Conservation area in Svalbard, Norway

Coordinates: 78°15′N 13°00′E

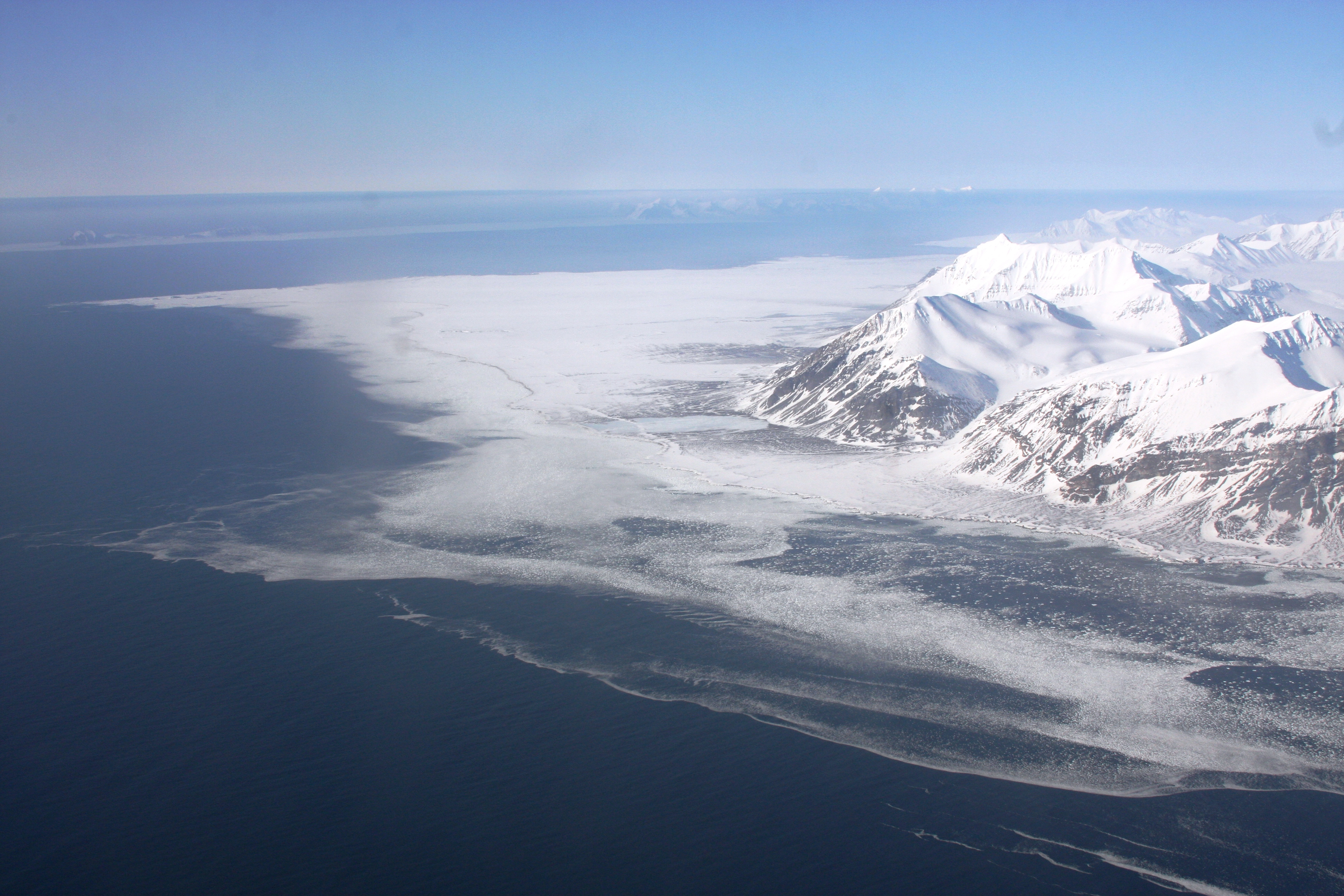
Aerial view of Daudmannsøyra, between the sea and the mountains

Daudmannsøyra Important Bird Area is a 1000 ha tract of land at Daudmannsøyra, a coastal plain on the western side of Spitsbergen, the largest island of Norway’s arctic Svalbard archipelago. It lies in south-western Oscar II Land on the northern side of the entrance to the inlet of Isfjorden. It is flat with boggy terrain studded with freshwater ponds. Not only that, but it was identified as an Important Bird Area (IBA) by BirdLife International because it supports populations of pink-footed and barnacle geese.
