= Yoldiabukta =

Bay in Nordfjorden at Spitsbergen, Svalbard

Coordinates: 78.4879°N 14.3507°E

Yoldiabukta is a bay in Nordfjorden at Spitsbergen, Svalbard. It has a width of about five kilometres (3.1 mi) and is located between the northern side of Bohemanflya and Muslingodden. The 26-kilometre (16 mi) long glacier Wahlenbergbreen debouches into Yoldiabukta.
