= Nils Gabriel Sefström =

Swedish chemist (1787-1845)

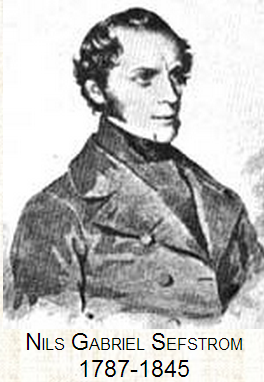
- Born: 2 June 1787; Ilsbo, Hälsingland, Sweden
- Died: 30 November 1845 (aged 58); Stockholm, Sweden
- Known for: Rediscovery of vanadium
- Scientific career
- Doctoral advisor: Jöns Jakob Berzelius

Nils Gabriel Sefström (2 June 1787 – 30 November 1845) was a Swedish chemist and metallurgist. A protégé of Jöns Jakob Berzelius, he rediscovered the element vanadium in 1830 while investigating the brittleness of steel.

== Early life and education ==
Sefström was born in the parish of Ilsbo in Hälsingland, the son of a Lutheran minister. After attending the local trivialskola in Hudiksvall and the gymnasium at Härnösand, he enrolled briefly at Uppsala University. In 1809 he moved to Stockholm, supporting himself as a private tutor while following Berzelius's public lectures. With his mentor's financial backing he completed a medical degree at the Karolinska Institute and served for a short time as an assistant physician at the Seraphim Hospital, but by 1817 he had turned decisively towards chemistry and metallurgy.

== Career and discovery of vanadium ==
Sefström's first teaching posts were at the Royal Military College and the Royal Caroline Medico-Surgical Institute. In 1822 he became chief teacher of the newly founded School of Mines at Falun, a position he held for sixteen years. Former students later praised his “inexhaustible energy” and strict integrity, qualities that made him widely respected—if occasionally feared.

While at Falun he analysed iron ore from the Taberg mine in Småland and detected traces of an unknown metal. The quantity was minute and easily confused with chromium, but by late 1830 he had isolated enough oxide to justify a visit to Berzelius's private laboratory in Stockholm. The two worked through the Christmas period and, early in January 1831, obtained a pure sample. Sefström proposed the name vanadium (after Vanadís, a poetical name for the Norse goddess Freyja) in reference to both the element’s Scandinavian provenance and the vivid colours of its salts. Berzelius willingly credited the discovery to his former student.

Sefström became a member of the Royal Swedish Academy of Sciences in 1815 and served as its president in 1840–1841. After resigning from the Falun school in 1838 because of ill-health, he accepted a less demanding appointment in Stockholm as scientific adviser to the Board of Mines, where he supervised the mineral cabinet and laboratory of the Mining College. He suffered a stroke and died in Stockholm on 30 November 1845.

== Legacy ==
The glacier Sefströmbreen and the mountain ridge Sefströmkammen in Spitzbergen are named in his honour. Vanadium had in fact been discovered earlier, in 1801, by the Spanish–Mexican mineralogist Andrés Manuel del Río, who called it erythronium; their identity was confirmed by Friedrich Wöhler in 1831.
