= Theodor Kjerulf =

Norwegian geologist and professor (1825–1888)

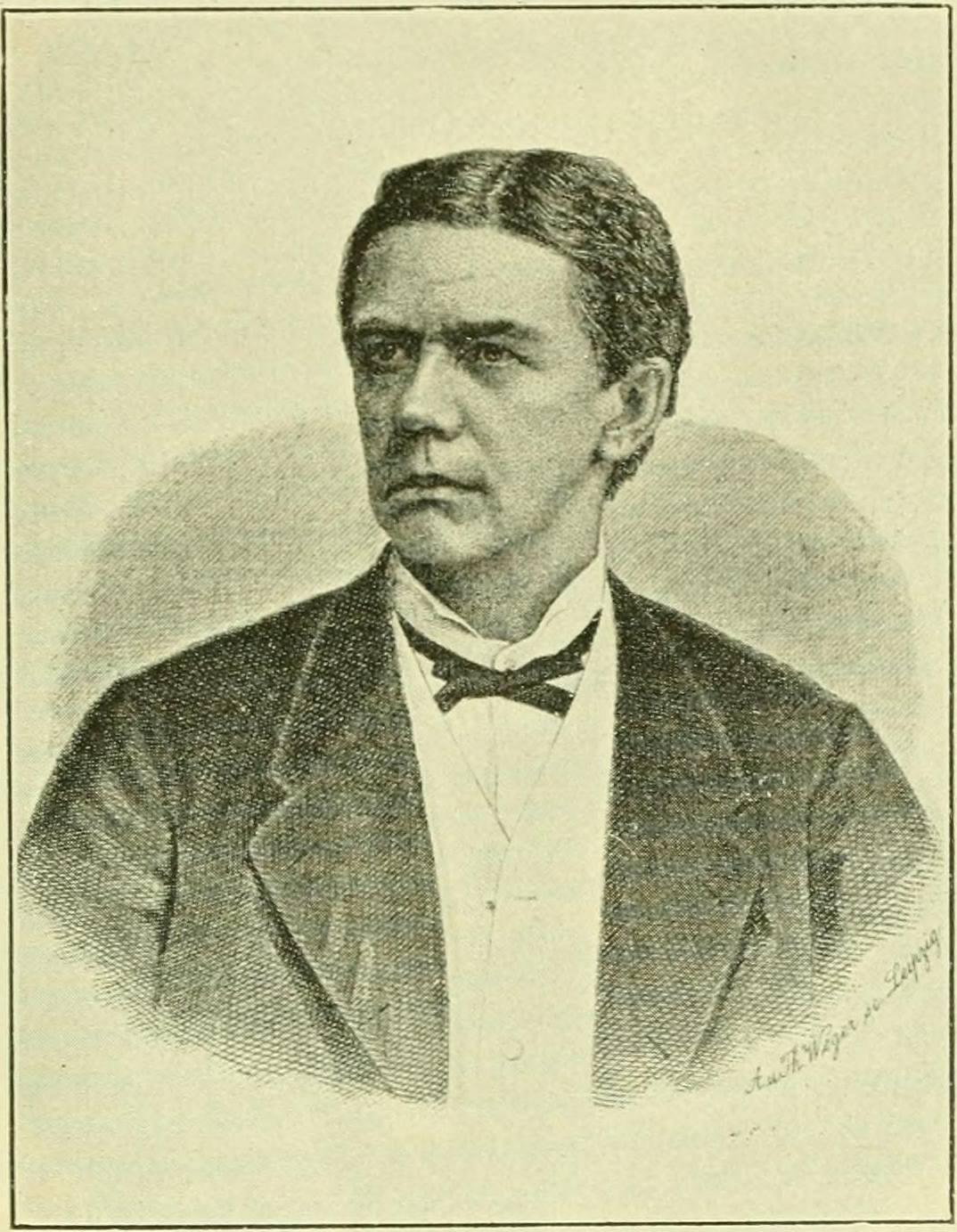
Theodor Kjerulf

Theodor Kjerulf (30 March 1825 – 25 October 1888) was a Norwegian geologist and professor at the University of Oslo. He also served as director of the Norwegian Geological Survey.

== Biography ==
He was born in Christiania (now Oslo), Norway. He was the son of Peder Kjerulf (1781–1841) and Elisabet Maria Lasson (1791–1873). He was the brother of composer Halfdan Kjerulf. He was educated in the Royal Frederick University (now University of Oslo) and subsequently studied in Germany, working with Karl Georg Bischof in Bonn and Robert Wilhelm Bunsen in Heidelberg.

In 1858, he was hired as a lecturer at the Royal Frederick University. In 1866 he was promoted to professor of geology. His contributions to the geology of Norway were numerous. From 1858 to 1888, he served as the first director of the Norwegian Geological Survey (Norges geologiske undersøkelse), which he had been instrumental in establishing. He also contributed to the systematic and detailed mapping of Norway's bedrock. His principal works were Das Christiania Silurbecken (1855) and Udsigt over det sydlige Norges Geologi (1879). From 1856 to 1857 he was the chairman of the Norwegian Polytechnic Society. Kjerulf was a member of the Royal Swedish Academy of Sciences from 1869.

== Personal life ==
In 1856, he married Marie Agnes Christiane Anker (1826–1915), daughter of Erik Theodor Christian Bernhardus Anker (1785–1858) and Betzy Sneedorff (1790–1875). She was the sister of Betsy Juliane Charlotte Anker (1830–1912) who married the noted painter Hans Gude.

Theodor Kjerulf published three collections of poetry; in 1848, 1854 and 1866. In 1855, he was awarded the Crown Prince's Gold Metal (Kronprinsens gullmedalje) by the University of Oslo. He became a knight of Order of St. Olav in 1866. He died at Kristiania in 1888 and was buried at Vår Frelsers gravlund.

== Selected works ==
- Das Christiania Silurbecken, 1855
- Stenriket og Fjeldlæren, 1865
- Udsigt over det sydlige Norges geologi, 1879
- Digte og Skizzer, 1890

== Legacy ==
Kjerulf Fjord in Northeast Greenland, Kjerulfbreen and Kjerulføya in Svalbard, Kjerulf Glacier in Jan Mayen, and Kjerulf Glacier in South Georgia, are named after him.

== Other sources ==
- Chisholm, Hugh, ed. (1911). "Kjerulf, Theodor" . Encyclopædia Britannica. Vol. 15 (11th ed.). Cambridge University Press. p. 843.

Preceded by L. Segelcke	Chairman of the Norwegian Polytechnic Society; 1856–1857	Succeeded by Hartvig Caspar Christie
