= Kjerulføya =

Island in Svalbard, Norway

- Location within Svalbard

Geography
- Location: Nordaustlandet, Svalbard
- Coordinates: 80°14.2′N 25°40.4′E

Kjerulføya is an island north of Nordaustlandet in Svalbard, Norway. It is named for Theodor Kjerulf. The island is located within Nordaust-Svalbard Nature Reserve.

In the film Orion's Belt, Kjerulfsøya is the location of the Soviet bearing station.
