= Kjerulf Glacier (Jan Mayen) =

Glacier in Jan Mayen, Norway

- Kjerulfbreen
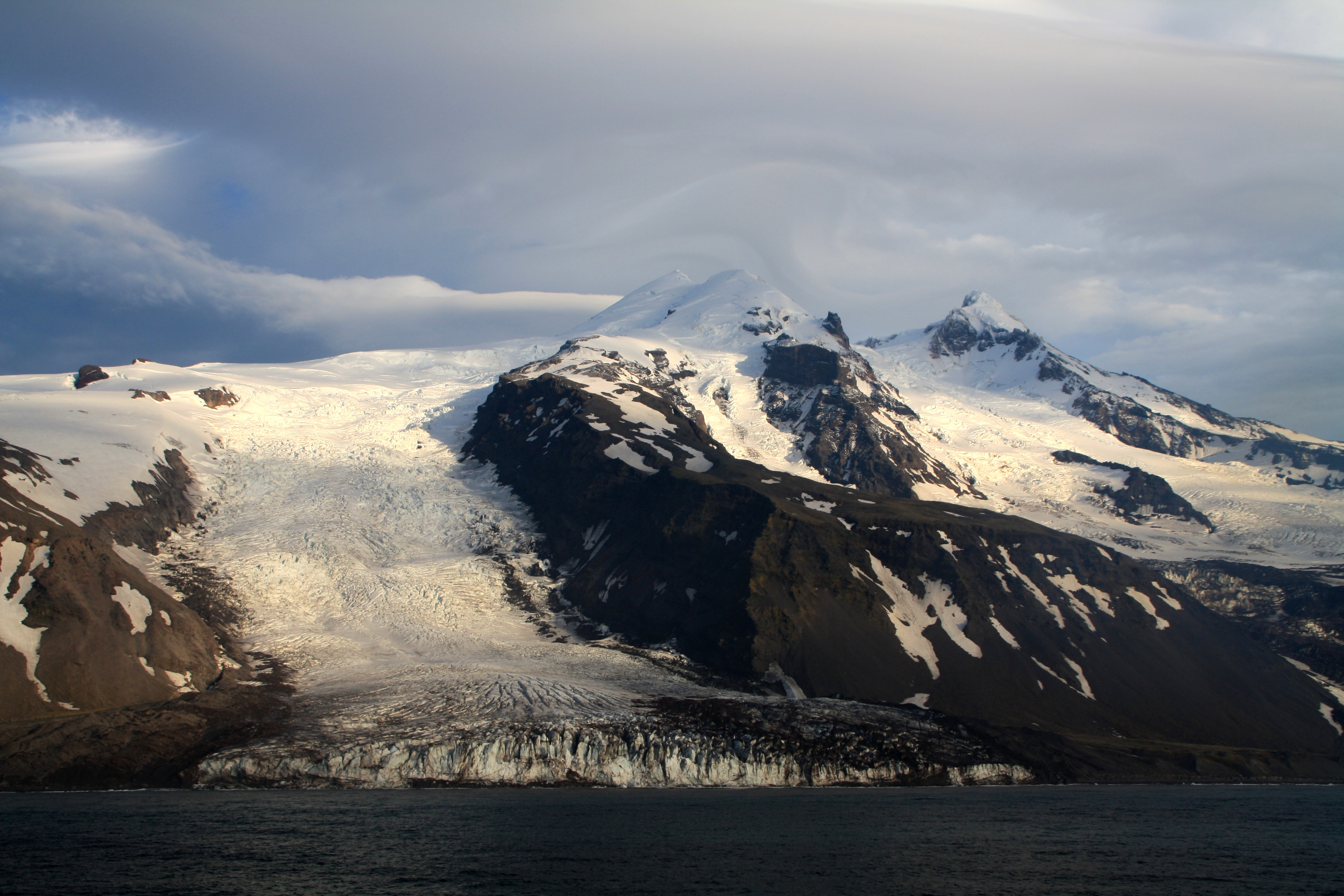
- The Kjerulf Glacier in the Beerenberg

- Location within North Atlantic
- Type: Piedmont glacier
- Location: Jan Mayen
- Coordinates: 71°7′9″N 8°7′42″W
- Area: 5.8 km^{2} (2.2 sq mi)
- Length: 6.4 km (4.0 mi)
- Terminus: North Atlantic Ocean

Kjerulf Glacier (Norwegian: Kjerulfbreen) is a glacier in Jan Mayen. It begins at the Hakluyttoppen slope, in the outer crater edge of the Beerenberg. The Kjerulf Glacier and both its neighbors, the Weyprecht Glacier in the west and the Svend-Foyn Glacier in the east, are the most active glaciers in the island.

The glacier was named after Norwegian geologist Theodor Kjerulf (1825–88), founder of the Geological Survey of Norway, during the Norwegian North-Atlantic Expedition 1876-1878 led by Henrik Mohn.

== See also ==
- List of glaciers in Norway
- Svalbard and Jan Mayen
