= Lovénberget =

Mountain in Svalbard, Norway

Coordinates: 79.4121°N 18.8058°E

Lovénberget is a mountain in Ny-Friesland at Spitsbergen, Svalbard. It is located on Lomfjordhalvøya. Lovénberget is among the largest bird cliffs of Svalbard, the steep cliffs with heights of more than 400 meters facing east towards Hinlopen Strait. It is named after Swedish zoologist Sven Ludvig Lovén.
