= Ekmanfjorden =

Fjord in Svalbard, Norway

Coordinates: 78°38′N 14°40′E

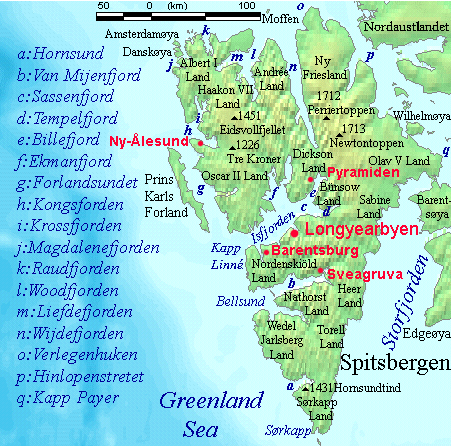
Ekmanfjorden (labelled f) lies on the northern side of Isfjorden on Spitsbergen's west coast

Ekmanfjorden is an 18 km (11 mi) long fjord branching north from inner Isfjorden. It is separated by Nordfjorden to the south by Sveaneset in the west and Kapp Wærn in the east. It lies within Nordre Isfjorden National Park.

The fjord is named after the Swedish businessman, and patron of the arts and sciences, Johan Oscar Ekman (1812–1907).
