= Klaratoppen =

Mountain in Oscar II Land, Spitsbergen, Svalbard

Coordinates: 78.3004°N 13.7750°E

Klaratoppen is a mountain in Oscar II Land at Spitsbergen, Svalbard. It has a height of 524 m.a.s.l. and is located on the ridge of Värmlandryggen. The mountain is named after the Swedish river Klarälven (in Värmland County).
