= Frösöfjellet =

Mountain in Spitsbergen, Norway

Coordinates: 78.6200°N 13.7827°E

Frösöfjellet is a mountain in Oscar II Land at Spitsbergen, Svalbard. It has an altitude of 871 metres, and is located on the ridge of Jämtlandryggen. It is named after the Swedish island Frösö.
