= Trygghamna =

Bay in Spitsbergen, Svalbard, Norway

Coordinates: 78°14′36″N 13°49′30″E

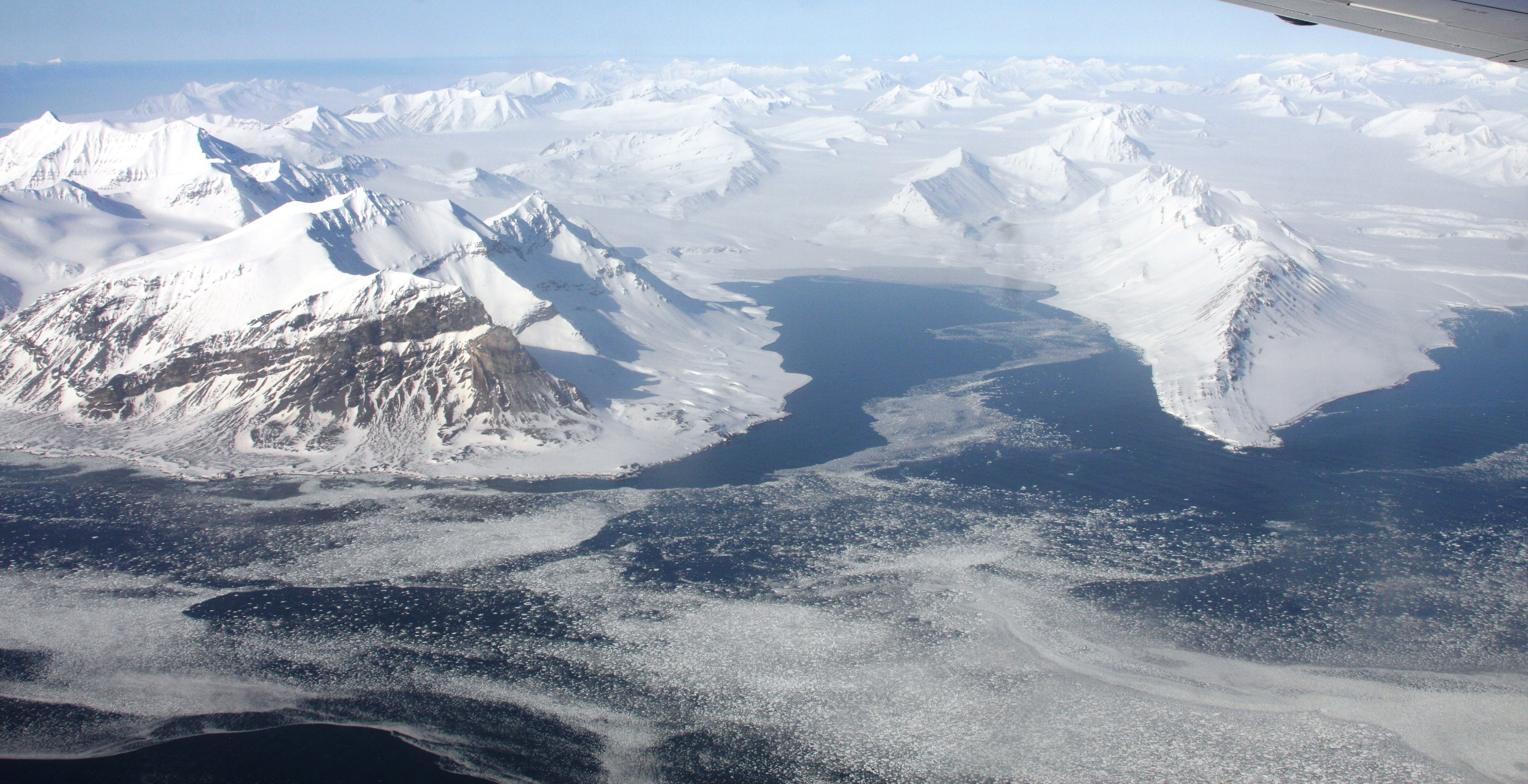
Trygghamna, with Protektorfjellet to the left and Värmlandryggen to the right

Trygghamna (English: haven) is a bay in Oscar II Land at Spitsbergen, Svalbard. It is about six kilometer long, located at the northern side of Isfjorden, east of Protektorfjellet, and separated from Ymerbukta by the mountain chain Värmlandryggen.

Historically, whalers frequently used Trygghamna as a safe harbour.
