= Wahlenbergbreen =

Glacier in Oscar II Land at Spitsbergen, Svalbard

Coordinates: 78.5843°N 13.8587°E

Wahlenbergbreen is a glacier in Oscar II Land at Spitsbergen, Svalbard. It has a length of 26 kilometers (16 mi), located on the southwestern side of Jämtlandryggen, and debouching into the bay Yoldiabukta of Nordfjorden. The glacier is named after Göran Wahlenberg.

== See also ==
- Wahlenbergfjorden
- Wahlenbergfjellet
