= Sveabreen =

Glacier between Oscar II Land and James I Land at Spitsbergen, Svalbard

Coordinates: 78.6946°N 13.6136°E

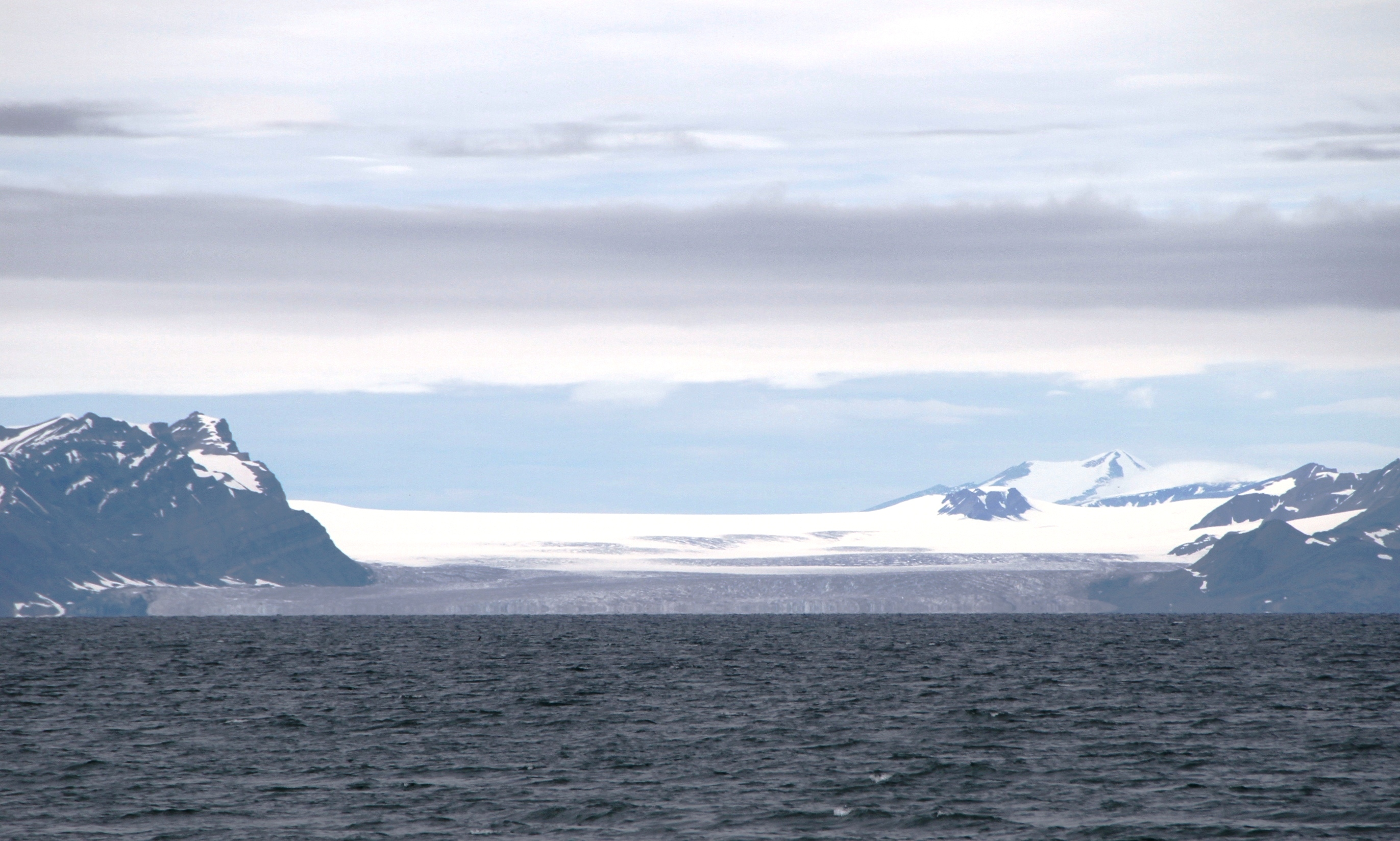
Sveabreen

Sveabreen is a glacier between Oscar II Land and James I Land at Spitsbergen, Svalbard. It has a length of 30 kilometers (19 mi), stretching from Kongsvegpasset at an altitude about 750 meters (2,460 ft), and debouching into Nordfjorden.
