= James I Land =

Land area on the northwestern part of Spitsbergen, Svalbard

Coordinates: 78°50′36″N 14°18′06″E

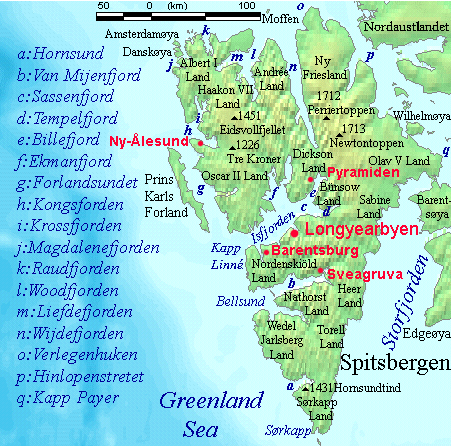
James I Land is located at the northwestern part of Spitsbergen.

James I Land is a land area on the northwestern part of Spitsbergen, Svalbard. It is named after King James I of England and Scotland. The 30 kilometer long glacier Sveabreen divides James I Land from Oscar II Land.
