= Nordre Isfjorden National Park =

Protected area in Svalbard, Norway

- IUCN category II (national park)

- Interactive map of Nordre Isfjorden National Park
- Location: Spitsbergen, Svalbard, Norway
- Nearest city: Longyearbyen
- Coordinates: 78°24′N 14°23′E
- Area: 2,954 km^{2} (1,141 sq mi)
- Established: 2003
- Governing body: Directorate for Nature Management

Nordre Isfjorden National Park (Norwegian: Nordre Isfjorden nasjonalpark) lies on Spitsbergen Island in the Svalbard archipelago, Norway. It lies across the Isfjorden north of Barentsburg. The park was opened in 2003.

The park carries the name of the fjord Isfjorden, one of the largest fjords in Svalbard. On the northern section of this fjord lies a virgin coastal landscape that sustains considerable vegetation and wildlife.

== Wildlife ==
During certain points in the year there is an inflow of warm, saline water into the Isfjorden, which results in the circulation of water layers that foster the growth of plankton, which sustains large number of crustaceans. The crustaceans attract fish like the capelin and polar cod, which in turn draw seabirds and mammals.

=== Birds ===
Only a few species of birds live in or visit the park, but the ones that are found here often gather in huge numbers. The birds found in Isfjorden include Brünnich's guillemot, little auk, Atlantic puffin, glaucous gull, northern fulmar and black-legged kittiwake. Other notable species recorded here are barnacle and pink-footed geese, and the Svalbard rock ptarmigan.

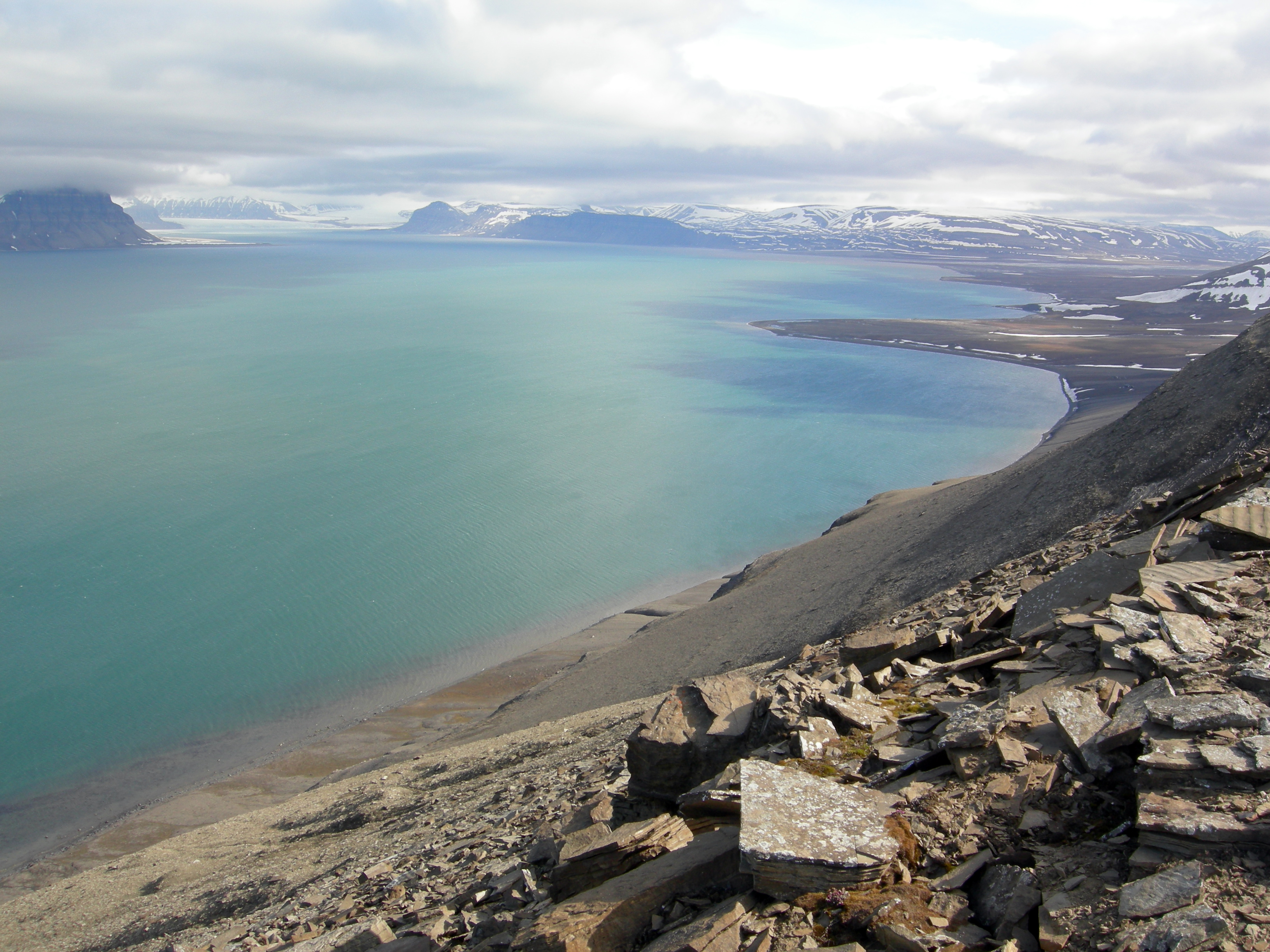
Isfjord from the south shore near Degeerdalen.
