= Isfjorden (Svalbard) =

Fjord in the Norwegian archipelago of Svalbard

Coordinates: 78°20′N 15°00′E

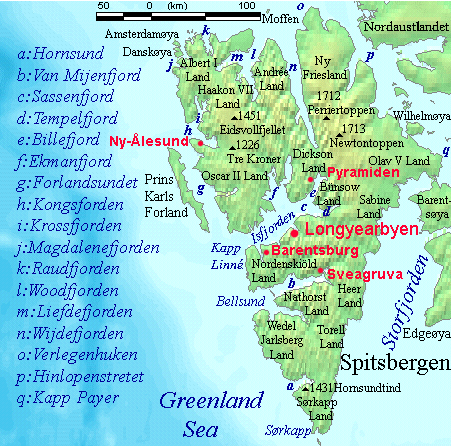
Isfjord lies on Spitsbergen's west coast.

Isfjorden is the second longest fjord in the Norwegian archipelago of Svalbard. It lies on the west side of Spitsbergen, an island in the Arctic Ocean about midway between Norway and the North Pole, and the largest in the archipelago. The mountain of Alkhornet stands on the northern side of the entrance to the fjord, as does the coastal plain of Daudmannsøyra. A portion of Isfjorden is included in the national parks of Norway as Nordre Isfjorden Land National Park. Around the fjord lie many of the largest settlements in Svalbard: Barentsburg, Longyearbyen (on the Adventfjorden) and Pyramiden.

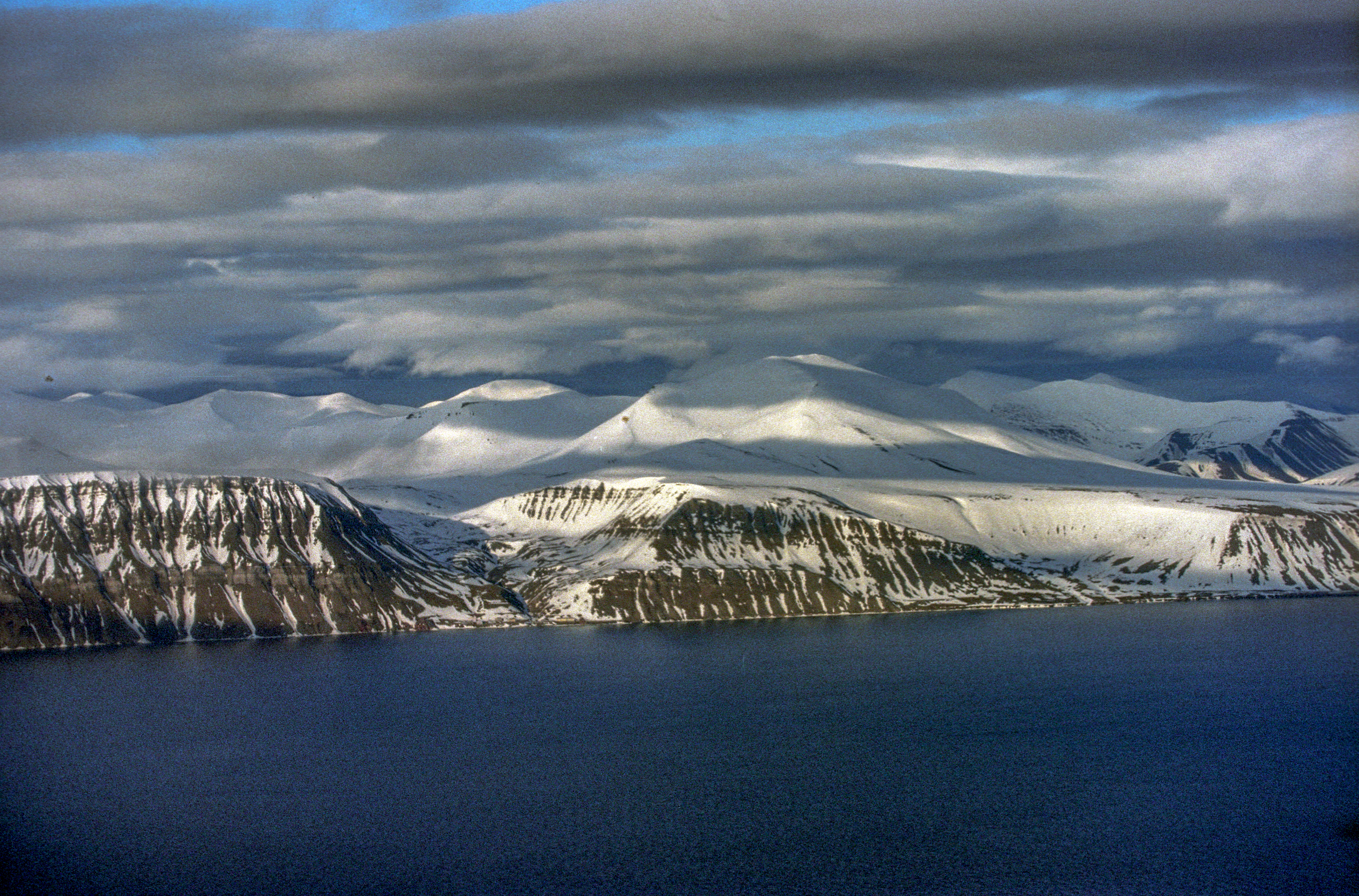
Isfjord

== History ==
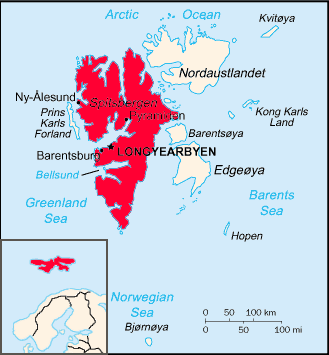
Location of Spitsbergen

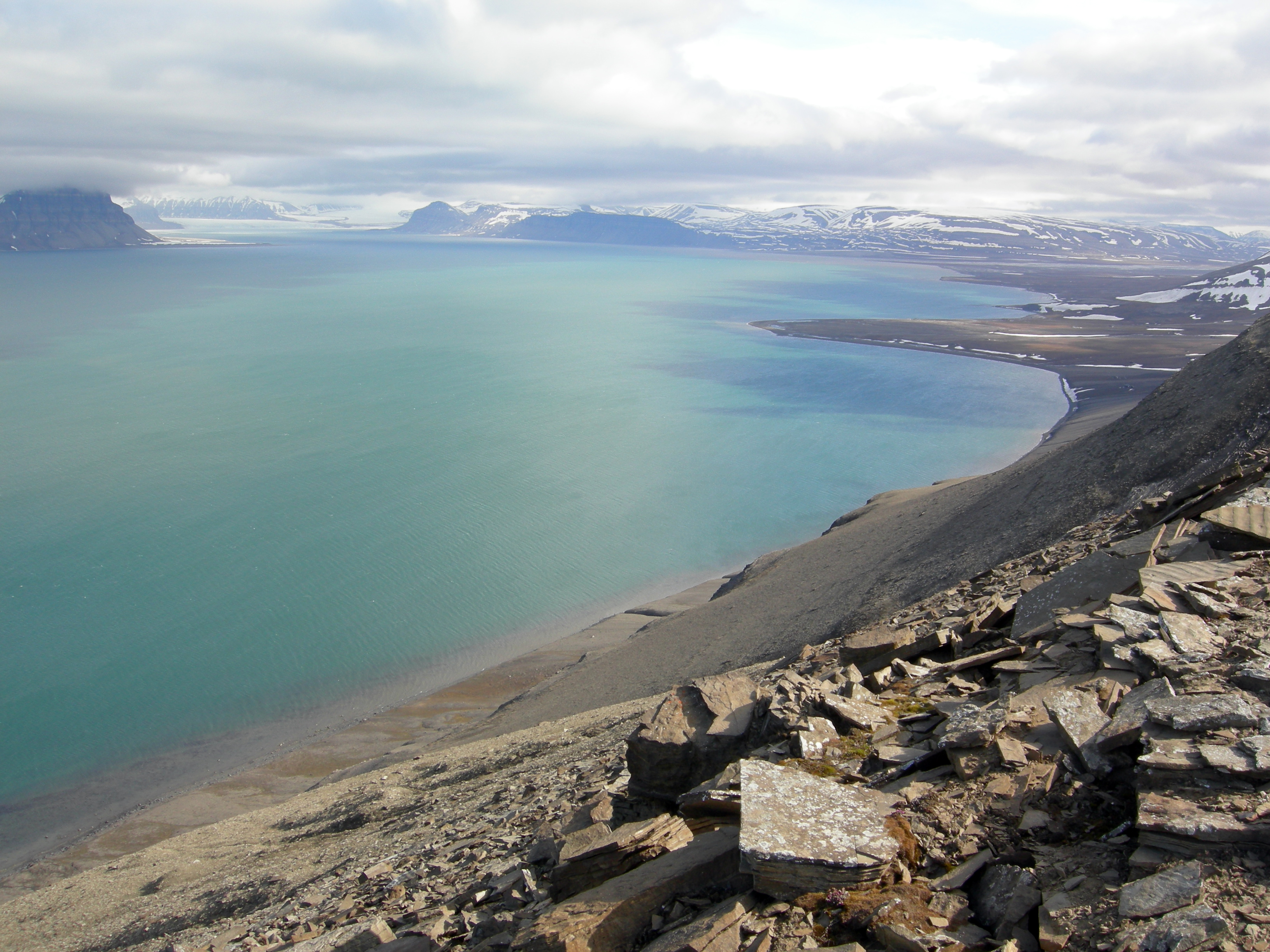
Isfjord from the south shore near Degeerdalen.

A Basque whaling ship from San Sebastian, under the command of Juan de Erauso and piloted by the Englishman Nicholas Woodcock, was the first to establish a temporary whaling station here in 1612. In 1613 French, Basque, and Dutch whaling ships resorted to Safehaven (Trygghamna) on the north side of Isford or in Green Harbour on the south side of the fjord. All were either driven off by armed English ships or were forced to pay a fine of some sort. In 1614 the Dutch agreed to give Isfjorden to the English. The English continued to use Isfjorden as a whaling base until at least the late 1650s.

== Svenskehuset Tragedy ==
The Svenskehuset Tragedy occurred in 1872–73 at Cape Thordsen in Isfjorden. Seventeen men died in Svenskehuset, now the oldest house on Spitsbergen. Today it is preserved as a cultural heritage site.
