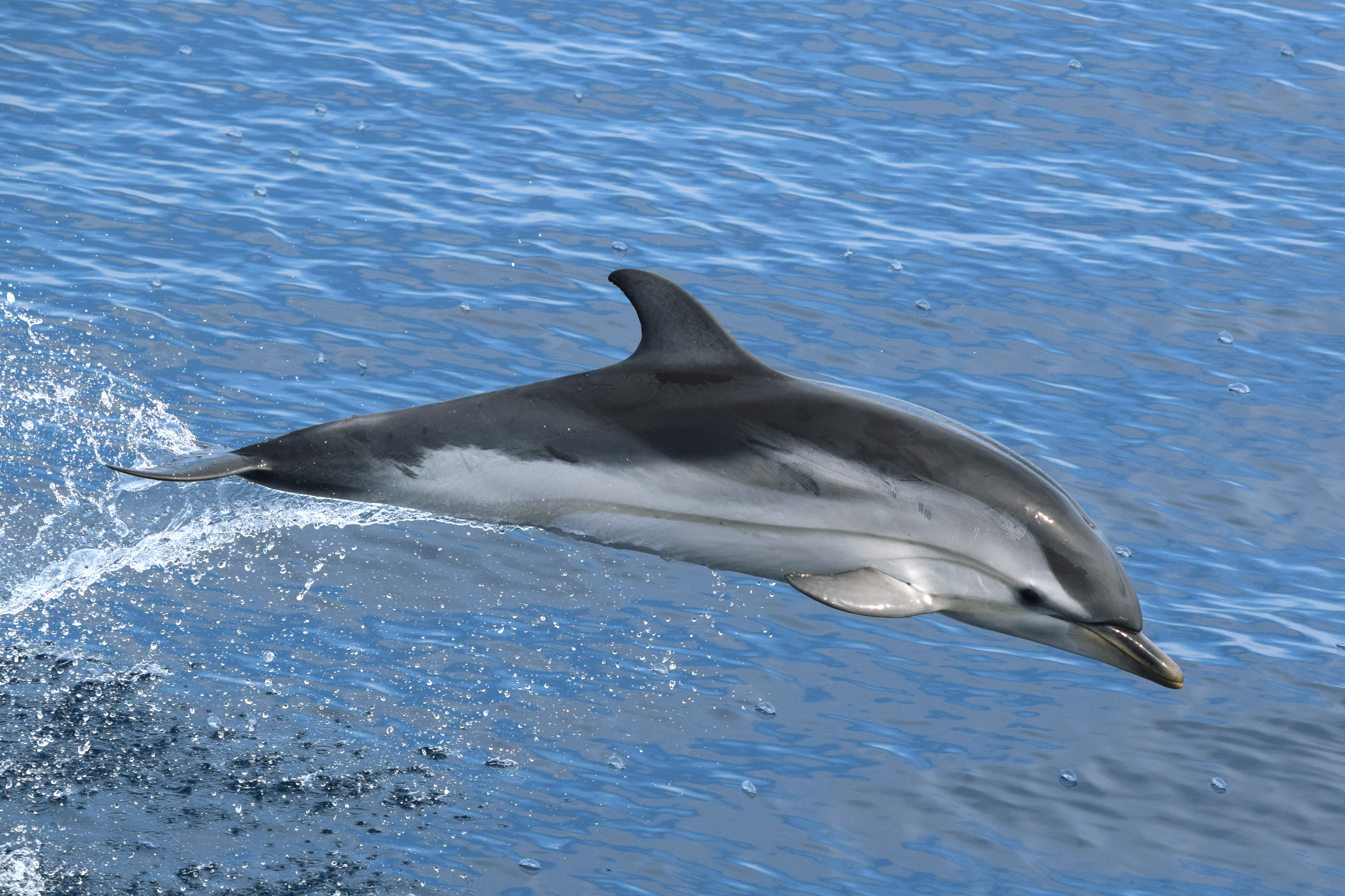
- A striped dolphin in full flight
- Size compared to an average human

Conservation status
- Least Concern (IUCN 3.1)
- CITES Appendix II

Scientific classification
- Kingdom: Animalia
- Phylum: Chordata
- Class: Mammalia
- Order: Artiodactyla
- Infraorder: Cetacea
- Family: Delphinidae
- Genus: Stenella
- Species: S. coeruleoalba

Binomial name
- Stenella coeruleoalba (Meyen, 1833)
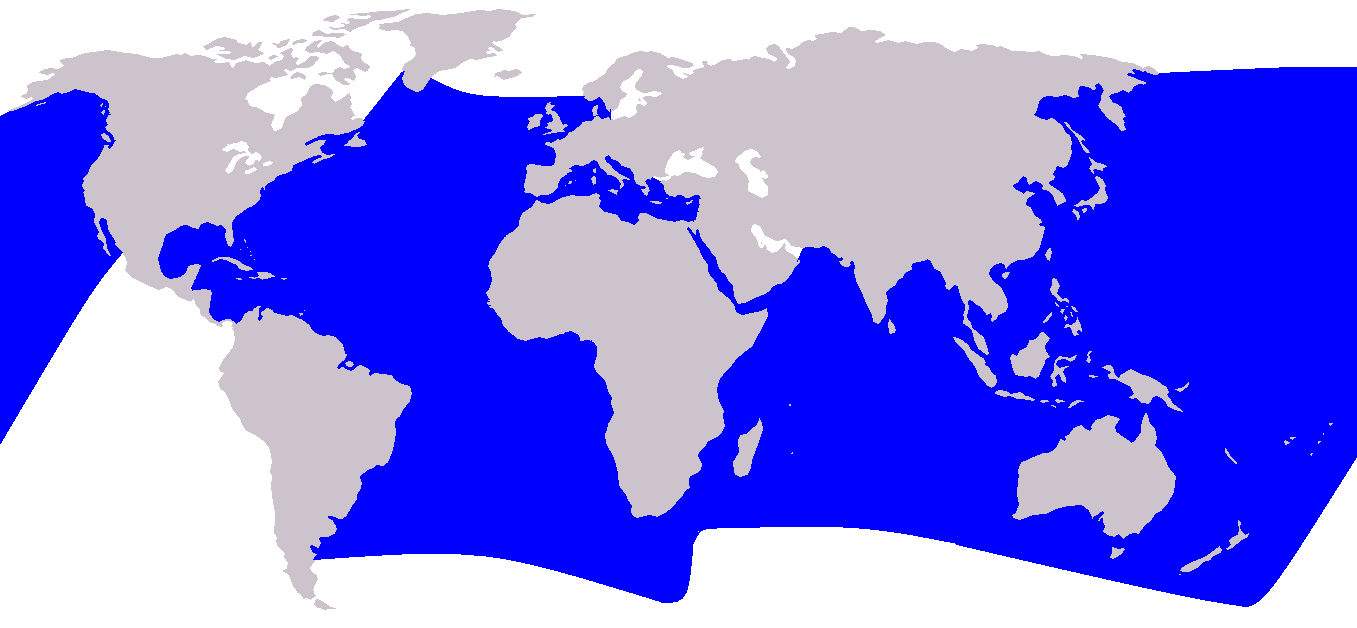
- Striped dolphin range

Synonyms
- Delphinus styx Gray, 1846; Delphinus euphrosyne Gray, 1846; Delphinus holbollii Nilsson, 1847; Delphinus lateralis Peale, 1848; Delphinus tethyos Gervais, 1853; Delphinus marginatus Duvernoy, 1857; Delphinus mediterraneus Loche, 1860; Delphinus asthenops Cope, 1865; Delphinus crotaphiscus Cope, 1865; Tursio dorcides Gray, 1866; Clymenia euphrosynoides Gray, 1868; Clymene burmeisteri Malm, 1871; Clymenia novaezelandiae Hector, 1873; Delphinus amphitriteus Philippi, 1893

= Striped dolphin =

Species of mammal

The striped dolphin (Stenella coeruleoalba) is a dolphin found in temperate and tropical waters of all the world's oceans. It is a member of the oceanic dolphin family, Delphinidae.

== Taxonomy ==
The striped dolphin, also known as the euphrosyne dolphin, is one of five species traditionally included in the genus Stenella; however, recent genetic work by LeDuc et al. (1999) indicates Stenella, as traditionally conceived, is not a natural group. According to that study, the closest relatives of the striped dolphin are the Clymene dolphin, the common dolphins, the Atlantic spotted dolphin, and Indo-Pacific bottlenose dolphin, which was formerly considered a subspecies of the common bottlenose dolphin. The striped dolphin was described by Prussian physician and botanist Franz Meyen in 1833.

== Description ==
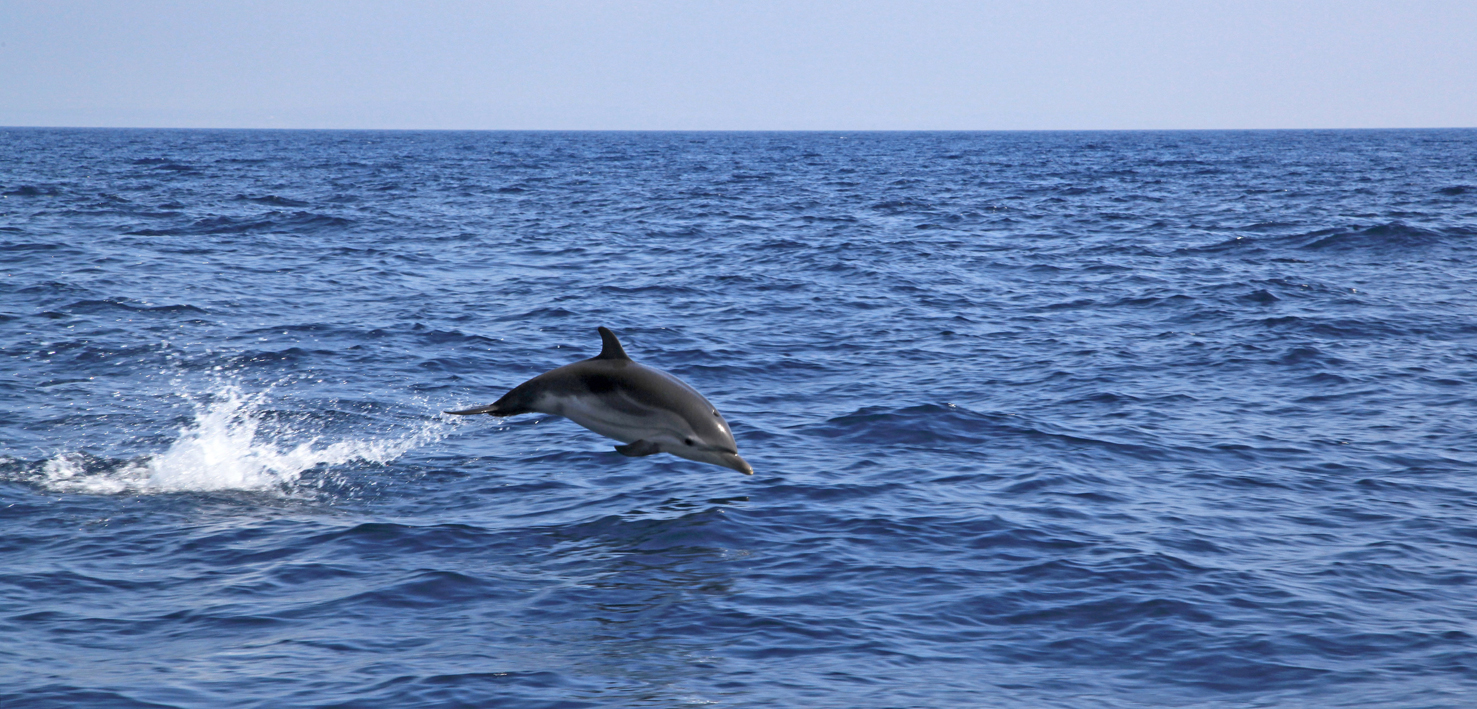
A striped dolphin leaps in the Mediterranean Sea off Toulon

The striped dolphin has a similar size and shape to several other dolphins that inhabit the same waters (see pantropical spotted dolphin, Atlantic spotted dolphin, Clymene dolphin). However, its colouring is very different and makes it relatively easy to notice at sea. The underside is blue, white, or pink. One or two black bands circle the eyes, and then run across the back, to the flipper. These bands widen to the width of the flipper which are the same size. Two further black stripes run from behind the ear — one is short and ends just above the flipper. The other is longer and thickens along the flanks until it curves down under the belly just prior to the tail stock. Above these stripes, the dolphin's flanks are coloured light blue or grey. All appendages are black, as well. At birth, individuals weigh about 10 kg (22 lb) and are up to a meter (3 feet) long. By adulthood, they have grown to 2.4 m (7.9 ft) (females) or 2.6 m (8 ft 6 in) (males) and weigh 150 kg (330 lb) (female) or 160 kg (350 lb) (male). Research suggested sexual maturity was reached at 12 years in Mediterranean females and in the Pacific at between seven and 9 years. Longevity is about 55–60 years. Gestation lasts about 12 months, with a three- or four-year gap between calving.

In common with other dolphins in its genus, the striped dolphin moves in large groups — usually up to thousands of individuals in number. Groups may be smaller in the Mediterranean Sea and the Atlantic Ocean. They may also mix with common dolphins. The striped dolphin is as capable as any dolphin at performing acrobatics — frequently breaching and jumping far above the surface of the water. Sometimes, it approaches boats in the Atlantic and Mediterranean, but this is dramatically less common in other areas, particularly in the Pacific, where it has been heavily exploited in the past. Striped dolphins are known as "streakers" throughout the eastern tropical Pacific due to their behavior of rapidly swimming away from vessels to avoid collisions.

== Population and distribution ==
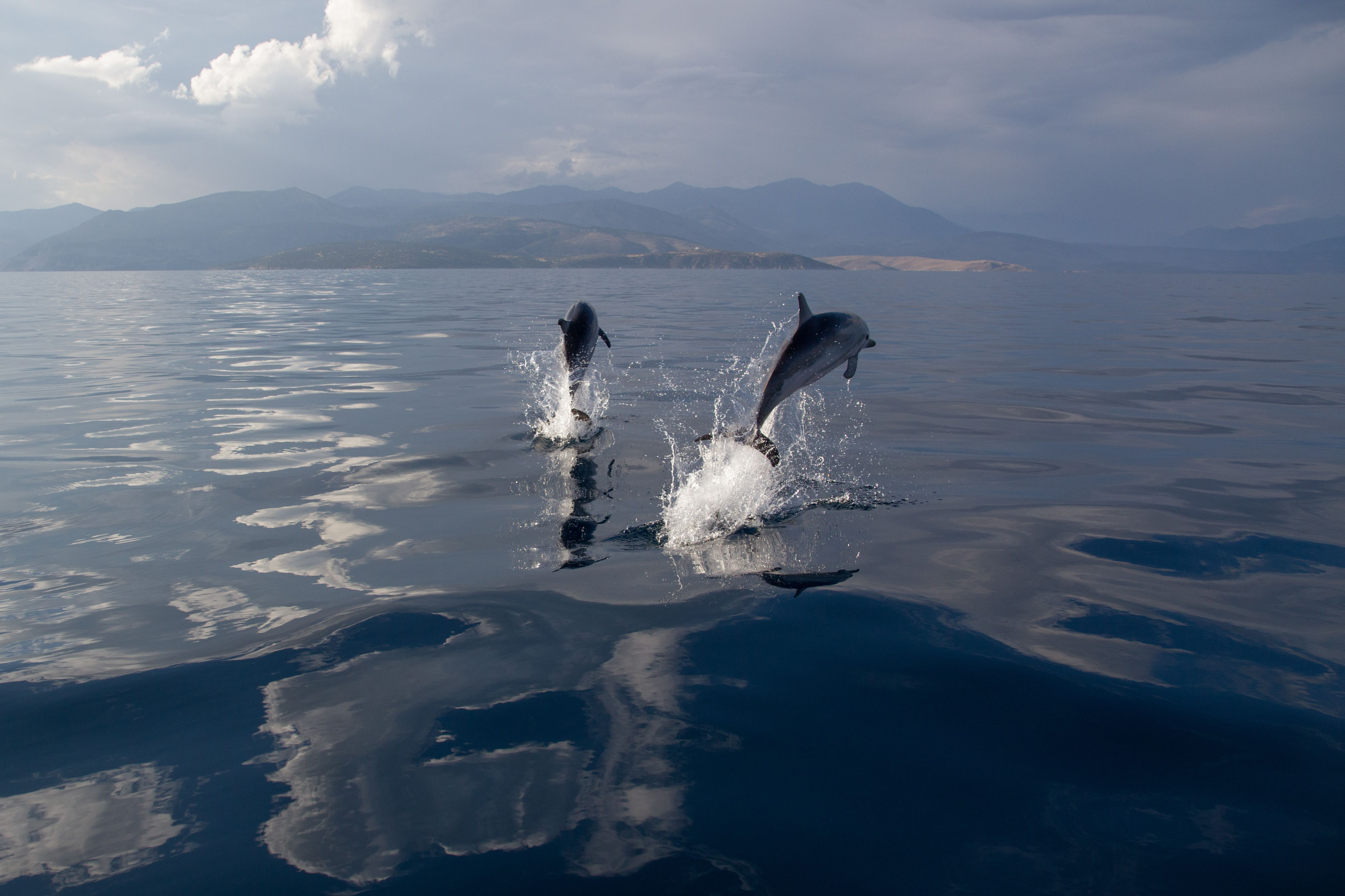
Striped dolphins jumping in the Gulf of Corinth

The striped dolphin inhabits temperate or tropical, off-shore waters. It is found in abundance in the North and South Atlantic Oceans, including the Mediterranean (sightings and strandings have been reported rather recently in Sea of Marmara) and Gulf of Mexico, the Indian Ocean, and the Pacific Ocean. Roughly speaking, it occupies a range running from 40°N to 30°S. It has been found in water temperatures ranging from 10 to 26 °C (50 to 79 °F), though the standard range is 18–22 °C (64–72 °F). In the western Pacific, where the species has been extensively studied, a distinctive migration pattern has been identified. This has not been the case in other areas. The dolphin appears to be common in all areas of its range, though that may not be continuous; areas of low population density do exist. The total population is in excess of two million. The southernmost record is of a stranded individual nearby Dunedin, southern New Zealand in 2017.

== Human interaction ==
Japanese whalers have hunted striped dolphins in the western Pacific since at least the 1940s and are one of the targeted species in the Taiji dolphin drive hunt. In the heyday of "striped dolphin drives", at least 8,000 to 9,000 individuals were killed each year, and in one exceptional year, 21,000 individuals were killed. Since the 1980s, following the introduction of quotas, this number has continued to decline, with about 200 striped dolphins hunted annually in the 2020s.

Conservationists are concerned about the Mediterranean population being threatened by pollution, disease, busy shipping lanes, and incidental catches in fishing nets such as long-liners, trawlers, gill nets, trammel and purse seine nets. During the last decades of the 20th century, heavy metals and organochlorine pollutants, particularly DDTs and PCBs, were a cause for concern because, as an apex predator, the concentrations present in the body tissues of striped dolphins were very high. Moreover, these compounds were found in other dolphin species to be transferred through parturition and lactation, and thus it was feared they could potentially hinder reproduction. However, the concentrations of organochlorine pollutants in the Mediterranean Sea and other areas have been gradually decreasing and thus reducing their impact on widlife, and current ecotoxicological studies focus on recently discovered pollutants, such as organophosphate and perfluoroalkyl compounds.

Attempts have been made to keep the striped dolphin in captivity, but most have failed, with the exception of a few captured in Japan for the Taiji Whale Museum.

== Diet ==
The adult striped dolphin eats fish, squid, octopus, krill, and other crustaceans. Mediterranean striped dolphins seem to prey primarily on hake, sardine and cephalopods, while northeastern Atlantic striped dolphins most often prey on fish, frequently lantern fish. They feed anywhere within the water column where prey is concentrated, and they can dive to depths of 700 m to hunt deeper-dwelling species.

== Conservation ==
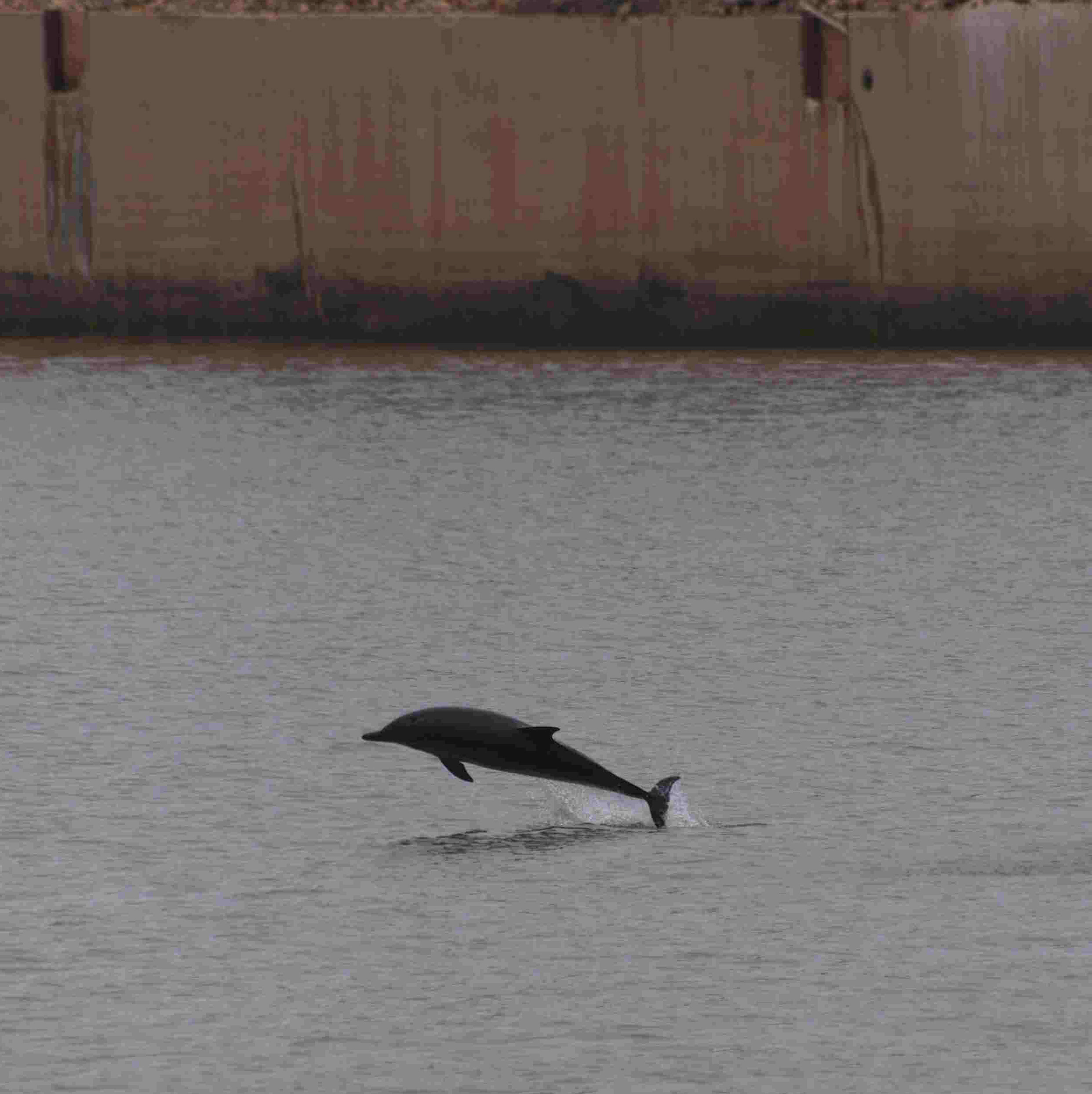
Small numbers of dolphins live nearby Gijón

The eastern tropical Pacific and Mediterranean populations of the striped dolphin are listed on Appendix II of the Convention on the Conservation of Migratory Species of Wild Animals (CMS), since they have an unfavorable conservation status or would benefit significantly from international co-operation organized by tailored agreements.

On the IUCN Red List the striped dolphin classifies as Least Concern despite a 30% reduction in its subpopulation over the last three generations. These dolphins may also be an indicator species for long-term monitoring of heavy metal accumulation in the marine environment because of their importance in the Japan pelagic food web as well as their ability to live for many years.

In addition, the striped dolphin is covered by the Agreement on the Conservation of Small Cetaceans of the Baltic, North East Atlantic, Irish and North Seas (ASCOBANS), the Agreement on the Conservation of Cetaceans in the Black Sea, Mediterranean Sea and Contiguous Atlantic Area (ACCOBAMS), the Memorandum of Understanding for the Conservation of Cetaceans and Their Habitats in the Pacific Islands Region (Pacific Cetaceans MOU) and the Memorandum of Understanding Concerning the Conservation of the Manatee and Small Cetaceans of Western Africa and Macaronesia (Western African Aquatic Mammals MoU)

== Strandings and mortality ==
Various cases of massive strandings over the years have been a cause for alarm. With an unfavorable conservation status and the increasing amount of pollution and debris piling in the ocean every year, striped dolphin's population may be decreasing in areas subject to severe human impacts.

In the Mediterranean, the population suffered a mass mortality event in the early 1990s that drastically reduced its numbers. The event began in central Spain but spread through three seemingly interconnected outbreaks, eventually encompassing the entire western Mediterranean and the Tyrrhenian and Aegean Seas. During the event, more than 1,000 striped dolphin carcasses were collected and examined, demonstrating that the primary cause of the outbreak was a dolphin morbillivirus (DMV) infection. However, high concentrations of organochlorine pollutants in the dolphins' tissues were considered to have triggered the process by affecting the animals' immune response. In particular, extremely high concentrations of polychlorinated biphenyls (PCBs), compounds with known immunosuppressive effects, were found in the blubber, muscle, and liver of affected dolphins. A census conducted after the mortality event revealed that some 117,000 striped dolphins had survived, although it was estimated that the event may have reduced the population to two-thirds of its initial size.In the following two decades, successive outbreaks of morbillivirus occurred in this population and also in pilot whales, but the magnitude of the associated mortality was much lower, an effect that was associated with the progressive reduction of the load of organochlorine pollutants that the waters of the Mediterranean have experienced.

Cetacean morbillivirus (CeMV) can be divided into six strains in cetaceans throughout the world, causing widespread mortality events in Europe, North America, and Australia. Studies have indicated that characteristics of CeMV may be more closely associated with disease in ruminants than carnivore species, which is representative of their evolutionary histories. Common disease presentation includes broncointerstitial pneumonia, encephalitis, lymphocytopenia, and increases in multinucleated cells. CeVM causes immunosuppression, increasing risk to secondary infection following acute resolution of clinical signs. Hypothesized transmission routes include via aerosol and trans-placentally.

== See also ==
- List of cetaceans
- Marine biology
