= Rånekampen =

Mountain in Svalbard, Norway

Coordinates: 77°44′21″N 16°15′52″E

Rånekampen (lit. "The hog ridge") is a mountain in Nathorst Land on the island of Spitsbergen, in the Norwegian archipelago Svalbard. It has a height of 1,185 m.a.s.l. The mountain is located south of Van Mijenfjorden, and is surrounded by the Vengefjellet, Lundgrenfjellet and Steindolptoppen mountains, and the Langlibreen, Steindolpbreen, Vengebreen, and Rånebreen glaciers. The valley of Langlidalen separates Rånekampen from the Langlifjellet and Sven Nilssonfjellet mountains.
