= Steenstrupdalen =

Valley of Spitsbergen, Norway

Coordinates: 77.551°N 16.073°E

Steenstrupdalen is a valley in Nathorst Land at Spitsbergen, in the Norwegian Svalbard archipelago. It is named after Danish geologist Knud Johannes Vogelius Steenstrup. The valley is surrounded by the mountains of Otto Pettersonfjellet, Marlowfjellet and Brogniartfjella. The glaciers of Sysselmannbreen and Steenstrupbreen extend into the valley.
