= Bassøefjellet =

Mountain in Spitsbergen, Norway

Coordinates: 77.700°N 16.114°E

Bassøefjellet is a mountain in Nathorst Land at Spitsbergen, Svalbard. It has peaks with heights of 1,081 and 953 m.a.s.l. respectively. The mountain is named after Norwegian civil servant and Governor of Svalbard, Johannes Gerckens Bassøe. It is located between Van Mijenfjorden and Van Keulenfjorden, west of Langlifjellet and south of Løyndbreen, with the glaciers of Lundbreen and Kvitskarvbreen to the south. East of the mountain is the valley of Bromelldalen.
