= Kvitskarvet =

Mountain in Svalbard, Norway

Coordinates: 77.660°N 16.323°E

Kvitskarvet is a mountain in Nathorst Land at Spitsbergen, in the Norwegian Svalbard archipelago. It has a height of 1,102 m.a.s.l. The Kvitskarvbreen glacier extends northwestwards from Kvitskarvet to the valley of Bromelldalen, while the Sysselmannbreen glacier extends southwestwards from Kvitskarvet to the valley of Steenstrupdalen.
