= Blæja =

Mountain in Spitsbergen, Norway

Coordinates: 62°02′N 5°47′E

Blæja ("The altar") is a mountain in Nathorst Land at Spitsbergen, Svalbard. It has a height of about 1,078 m.a.s.l. The mountain is surrounded by the glaciers of Kvamsisen, Steenstrupbreen and Svalbreen. Svalbreen extends from Blæja to the valley of Danzigdalen.
