= Steindolpbreen =

Glacier in Svalbard, Norway

Coordinates: 77.715°N 16.315°E

Steindolpbreen is a glacier in Nathorst Land at Spitsbergen, in the Norwegian Svalbard archipelago. It extends from Juvtinden and the eastern side of Steindolptoppen to Snøkuvbreen. North of the glacier are the mountains of Rånekampen and Vengefjellet.
