= Langlidalen =

Valley of Spitsbergen, Norway

Coordinates: 77.745°N 16.124°E

Langlidalen ("the long hillside valley") is a valley in Nathorst Land on the island of Spitsbergen, Svalbard. It has a length of about three kilometers, and is located between the mountains of Rånekampen on the western side, and Langlifjellet and Sven Nilssonfjellet on the eastern side. The glacier of Langlibreen extends from Steindolptoppen into the upper part of Langlidalen.
