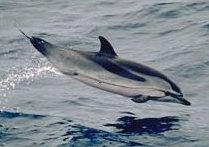
- Striped dolphin

Scientific classification
- Kingdom: Animalia
- Phylum: Chordata
- Class: Mammalia
- Order: Artiodactyla
- Infraorder: Cetacea
- Family: Delphinidae
- Subfamily: Delphininae
- Genus: Stenella; Gray, 1866

Type species
- Steno attenuatus Gray, 1846

Species
- S. attenuata S. frontalis S. longirostris S. clymene S. coeruleoalba

= Stenella =

Stenella Temporal range: Neogene–Present

Genus of mammals

Stenella is a genus of marine mammals in Delphinidae, the family informally known as the oceanic dolphins.

== Species ==
Currently, five species are recognised in this genus:

Image	Common name	Scientific name	Distribution
	Pantropical spotted dolphin	S. attenuata	Tropical oceans worldwide
	Atlantic spotted dolphin	S. frontalis	Tropical and warm temperate Atlantic Ocean
	Spinner dolphin	S. longirostris	Tropical oceans worldwide
	Clymene dolphin	S. clymene	Tropical and warm temperate North Atlantic Ocean
	Striped dolphin	S. coeruleoalba	Tropical and temperate oceans worldwide, including the Mediterranean

S. rayi was a species of this genus found in North Carolina, in the early Pliocene.

The common name for species in this genus is the "spotted dolphins" or the "bridled dolphins". They are found in temperate and tropical seas all around the world. Individuals of several species begin their lives spotless and become steadily more covered in darker spots as they get older.

The genus name comes from the Greek stenos meaning narrow. It was coined by John Gray in 1866 when he intended it as a subgenus of Steno. Modern taxonomists recognise two genera.

The clymene dolphin (S. clymene) is the only confirmed case of hybrid speciation in marine mammals, descending from the spinner dolphin (S. longirostris) and the striped dolphin (S. coeruleoalba).

Stenella dolphins tend to be more active during nighttime and spend their daytime resting. Although these dolphins are supposed to spend 60% of their daytime resting, they happen to be exposed to human activities for 80% of their day. These patterns of sleep deprivation can have negative impact on their resting habit and leads to decline in their population size.
