= Sven Nilssonfjellet =

Mountain in Svalbard, Norway

Coordinates: 77°43′58″N 16°00′49″E

Sven Nilssonfjellet is a mountain in Nathorst Land at Spitsbergen, Svalbard. It has a height of 988 m.a.s.l. The mountain is named after Swedish zoologist Sven Nilsson. It is located west of Langlidalen and Langlifjellet, and north of Løyndbreen, at the southern side of Van Mijenfjorden. East of the mountain is the valley of Bromelldalen.
