= Kvitskarvbreen =

Glacier in Svalbard, Norway

Coordinates: 77.670°N 16.152°E

Kvitskarvbreen ("the white mountain glacier") is a glacier in Nathorst Land at Spitsbergen, in Norway's Svalbard archipelago. It has a length of about 8.5 kilometers, and extends northwestwards from the mountain of Kvitskarvet to the valley of Bromelldalen. The glaciers of Lundbreen, Juvbreen and Zimmerbreen are all tributaries to Kvitskarvbreen.
