= Vengefjellet =

Mountain in Svalbard, Norway

Coordinates: 77.739°N 16.370°E

Vengefjellet ("The wing mountain") is a mountain in Nathorst Land at Spitsbergen, in Svalbard archipelago of Norway. It has a height of 762 m.a.s.l., and is located west of the valley of Danzigdalen. The mountain is surrounded by the glaciers of Steindolpbreen and Snøkuvbreen to the south, and Vengebreen to the west and north.
