= Sysselmannbreen =

Glacier in Svalbard, Norway

Coordinates: 77.620°N 16.066°E

Sysselmannbreen is a glacier in Nathorst Land at Spitsbergen, Svalbard. It has a length of about eleven kilometers, and extends southwestwards from the mountain of Kvitskarvet to the valley of Steenstrupdalen. The mountain of Marlowfjellet separates Sysselmannbreen from Steenstrupbreen.
