= Snøkuvbreen =

Glacier in Svalbard, Norway

Coordinates: 77.70°N 16.35°E

Snøkuvbreen is a glacier in Nathorst Land at Spitsbergen, in Norway's Svalbard archipelago. It is surrounded by the mountains of Kassen, Snøkuven and Juvtinden, and extends down to the valley of Danzigdalen. The glacier is approximately six kilometers long, and is located at 77.7000000 latitude and 16.3666700 longitude.
