= Langlifjellet =

Mountain in Svalbard, Norway

Coordinates: 77.722°N 16.150°E

Langlifjellet ("The long hillside mountain") is a mountain in Nathorst Land at Spitsbergen, Svalbard. It has peaks with heights of 1,011, 973 and 885 m.a.s.l. respectively. The mountain is surrounded by the mountains of Sven Nilssonfjellet, Bassøefjellet, and Steindolptoppen, and the glaciers of Løyndbreen, Lundbreen and Langlibreen. The valley of Langlidalen separates Langlifjellet and Sven Nilssonfjellet from the mountain of Rånekampen.
