= Juvtinden =

Mountain in Svalbard, Norway

Coordinates: 77°41′33″N 16°16′23″E

Juvtinden is a mountain in Nathorst Land at Spitsbergen, Norway's Svalbard archipelago. It has a height of 1,138 m.a.s.l. The mountain is surrounded by the Snøkuvbreen, Steindolpbreen, Lundbreen and Juvbreen glaciers. Steindolptoppen (1,035 m) is a slightly shorter neighboring peak of Juvtinden.
