= Løyndbreen =

Glacier in Svalbard, Norway

Coordinates: 77.713°N 16.105°E

Løyndbreen ("The Hidden Glacier") is a glacier in Nathorst Land at Spitsbergen, Svalbard. It has a length of about four kilometers, situated between the mountains of Bassøefjellet and Langlifjellet, and extending towards the valley of Bromelldalen.
