= Langlibreen =

Coordinates: 77.723°N 16.197°E

Langlibreen ("The Long Hillside Glacier") is a glacier in Nathorst Land at Spitsbergen, Svalbard. It has a length of about 4.5 kilometers, situated between the mountains of Rånekampen and Langlifjellet, and extending towards the valley of Langlidalen.
