= Svalbreen =

Glacier in Svalbard

Coordinates: 77.662°N 16.528°E

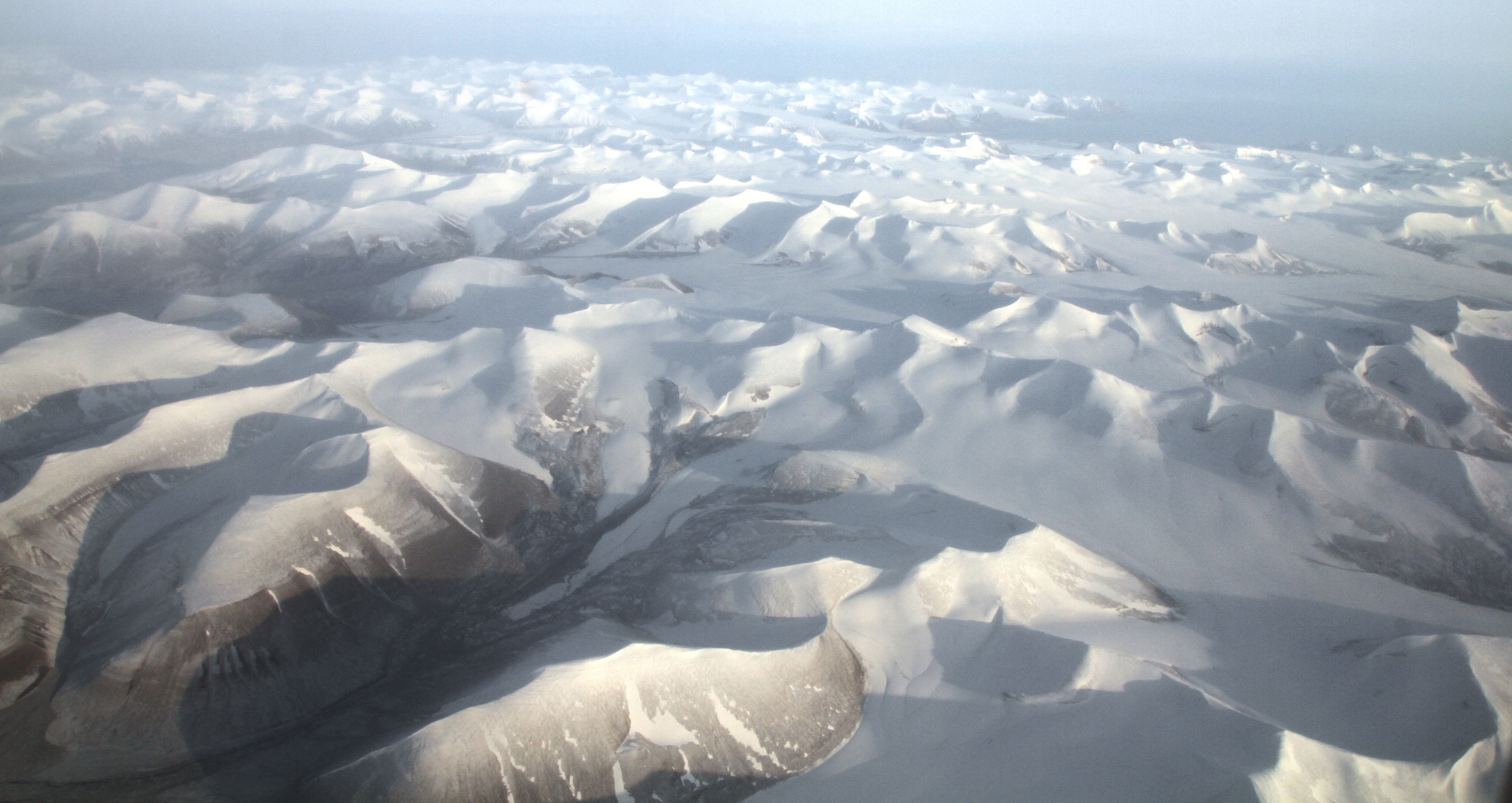
Svalbreen, Juvbreen, Sysselmannbreen

Svalbreen is a glacier in Nathorst Land at Spitsbergen, Svalbard. Approximately thirteen kilometers in length, it extends from Blæja mountain to the Danzigdalen valley. Svalhøgda mountain is located between Svalbreen and Harebreen, and the glaciers merge further north.
