= Wittrockfjellet =

Mountain in Svalbard, Norway

Coordinates: 77.607°N 15.796°E

Wittrockfjellet is a mountain in Nathorst Land at Spitsbergen, Svalbard. It is named after Swedish botanist Veit Brecher Wittrock. The mountain is located at the northern side of Van Keulenfjorden. The mountain ridge extends over a length of about 3.5 kilometers, and its highest peak is 931 m.a.s.l. The valley of Wittrockdalen separates Wittrockfjellet from the ridge of Brogniartfjella.
