= Lundbreen =

Glacier on archipelago of Svalbard

Coordinates: 77.697°N 16.201°E

Lundbreen is a glacier in Nathorst Land at Spitsbergen, Svalbard. It has a length of about 4 kilometres (2.5 mi), extending from Juvtinden to Kvitskarvbreen, beside the mountain of Langlifjellet. The glacier is named after the civil servant Egil Lund.
