= Sven Nilsson (zoologist) =

Swedish zoologist and archaeologist

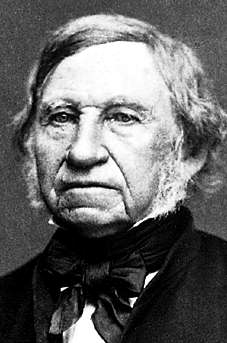
Sven Nilsson

Sven Nilsson (8 March 1787 – 30 November 1883) was a Swedish zoologist and archaeologist.

== Life and work ==
Nilsson was director of the Naturhistoriska Riksmuseet (Sweden's natural history museum) from 1828 to 1831, professor of Natural History at Lund University from 1832 to 1856, and rector of Lund University from 1845 to 1846.

Nilsson was a prolific author, publishing large works on different groups of the fauna of Scandinavia. He worked as a field archaeologist and introduced ethnographic perspectives in archaeology. He was made a member of the Royal Swedish Academy of Sciences in 1821.

Nilsson corresponded with William Yarrell, acting as the authority on Swedish avifauna for Yarrell's History of British Birds (1843). For example, Yarrell records Nilsson as saying "it infests every house", referring to the house sparrow.

He was elected as a member of the American Philosophical Society in 1869.

== Legacy ==
- A genus of turtles, Nilssonia, was named in honor of Nilsson by John Edward Gray in 1872.
- The mountain Sven Nilssonfjellet in Svalbard is also named in his honor.

== Books by Nilsson ==
- De variis mammalia disponendi modis (1812)
- Ornithologia suecica (1817–1821)
- Prodromus ichthyologiae scandinavicae (1832)
- Observationes ichthyologicae (1835)
- Skandinavisk fauna (1820–1853)
- Historia molluscorum Sueciae (1823)
- Petrificata suecana (1827)
- Illuminerade figurer till skandinavisk fauna (1832–1840)
- Prodromus ichthyologiae (1832)
- Skandinaviska Nordens Ur-invånare (1838–1843, 2nd ed. 1866) - Sven Nilsson describes four stages of culture transition: 1. Hunting and Fishing 2. Pastoralism 3. Agriculture 4. Civilization
- Die Ureinwohner des skandinavischen Nordens (1863–1868)
- The Primitive Inhabitants of Scandinavia: An Essay on Comparative Ethnography (3rd ed. 1868)

== See also ==
- Category:Taxa named by Sven Nilsson
