= Otto Pettersonfjellet =

Mountain in Svalbard, Norway

Coordinates: 77°32′22″N 16°19′56″E

Otto Pettersonfjellet is a mountain in Nathorst Land at Spitsbergen, Svalbard. It extends over a length of about seven kilometers, and its highest peak is 1,076 m.a.s.l. It is named after Swedish oceanographer Sven Otto Petterson. The glacier of Storvolbreen is between Otto Pettersonfjellet and Storvola, and Tarmbreen separates Otto Pettersonfjellet from Gloføykja.
