= Marlowfjellet =

Mountain in Svalbard, Norway

Coordinates: 77.594°N 16.152°E

Marlowfjellet is a mountain in Nathorst Land at Spitsbergen, in the Svalbard archipelago of Norway. The mountain is a 6-kilometer-long ridge with three peaks of 1,052, 1,016 and 1,022, m.a.s.l., respectively, running from south to north. The mountain is surrounded by the Sysselmannbreen and Steenstrupbreen glaciers. It is named after Norwegian mining engineer and military officer Wolmer Tycho Marlow.
