= West African Aquatic Mammals Memorandum of Understanding =

Memorandum of Understanding Concerning the Conservation of the Manatee and Small Cetaceans of Western Africa and Macaronesia
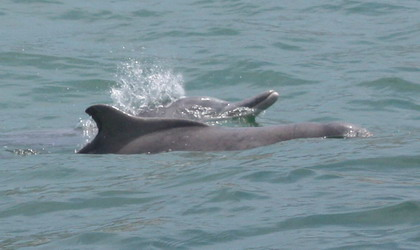
- Context: nature conservation
- Effective: 3 October 2008
- Signatories: Angola; Benin; Cape Verde; Chad; Congo; Côte d’Ivoire; Equatorial Guinea; Gabon; Ghana; Guinea-Bissau; Liberia; Mali; Mauritania; Niger; Togo; Portugal; Guinea
- Languages: English and French

The Memorandum of Understanding (MoU) Concerning the Conservation of the Manatee and Small Cetaceans of Western Africa and Macaronesia is a Multilateral Environmental Memorandum of Understanding and entered into effect on 3 October 2008 under the auspices of the Bonn Convention (Convention on Migratory Species of Wild Animals; CMS). The MoU covers 29 range States (Angola, Benin, Burkina Faso, Cameroon, Cape Verde, Chad, Congo, Côte d'Ivoire, Democratic Republic of Congo, Equatorial Guinea, Gabon, Gambia, Ghana, Guinea, Guinea-Bissau, Liberia, Mali, Mauritania, Morocco, Namibia, Niger, Nigeria, Portugal (Madeira and Azores), São Tomé and Príncipe, Senegal, Sierra Leone, South Africa, Spain (Canary Islands) and Togo). As of August 2012, 17 range States have signed the MoU, as well as a number of cooperating organizations.

== Development of MoU ==
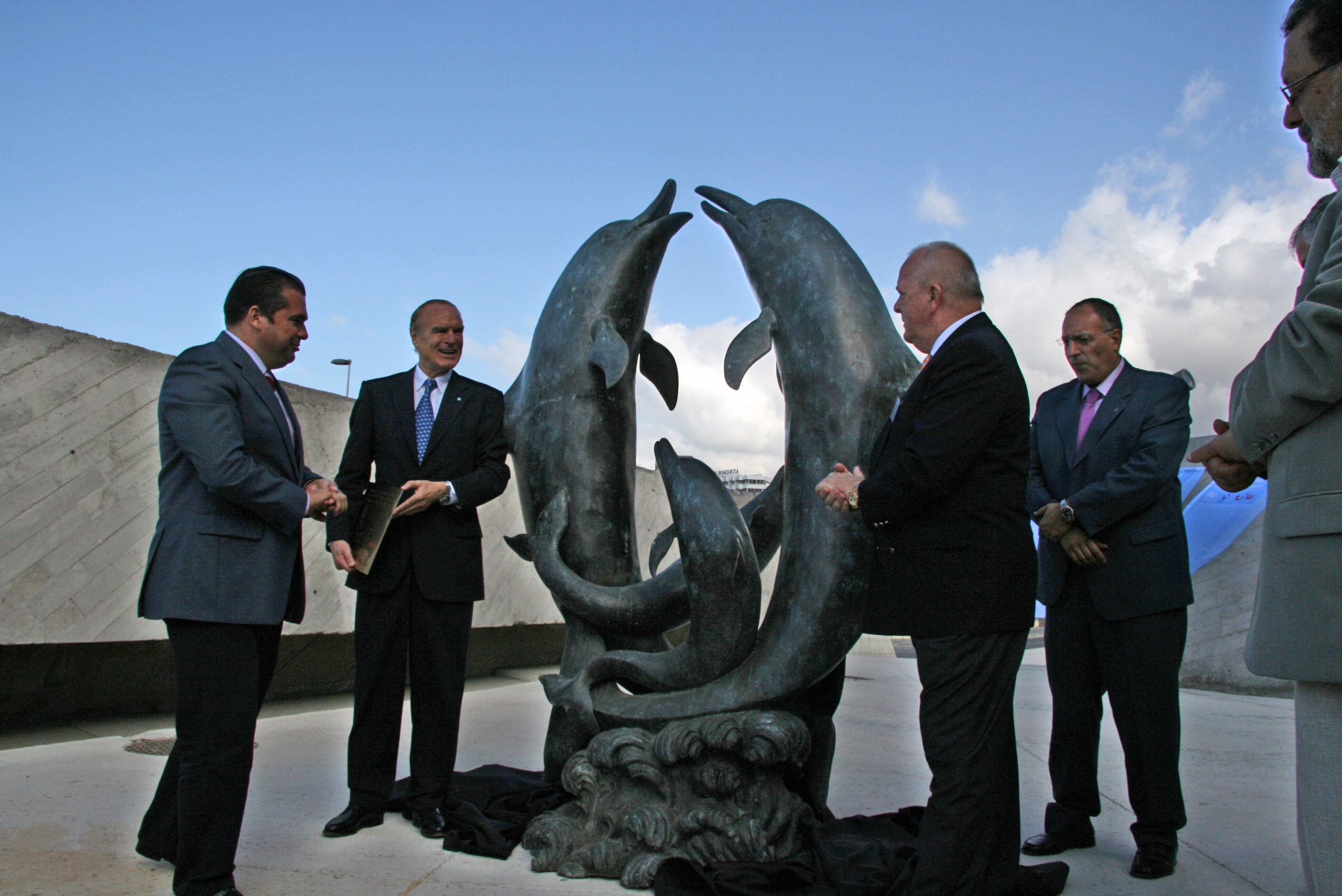
WATCH I meeting, Adeje, Tenerife, October 2007

In May 2000 a workshop on “Conservation and Management of small cetaceans of the coast of Africa” was held in Conakry, Guinea. It was during this workshop that the idea of developing an action plan for the conservation of West African small cetaceans and manatees was launched. The meeting was attended by representatives of seven range States (Benin, Equatorial Guinea, Guinea, Ivory Coast, Senegal, Gambia and Togo) alongside international experts. The Conference of the Parties to the CMS Convention adopted two resolutions (Resolution 7.7 and 8.5) and one recommendation (Recommendation 7.3) at its Seventh and Eight meeting in respectively 2002 and 2005, to support the development of a CMS instrument on these species as well as Action Plans.

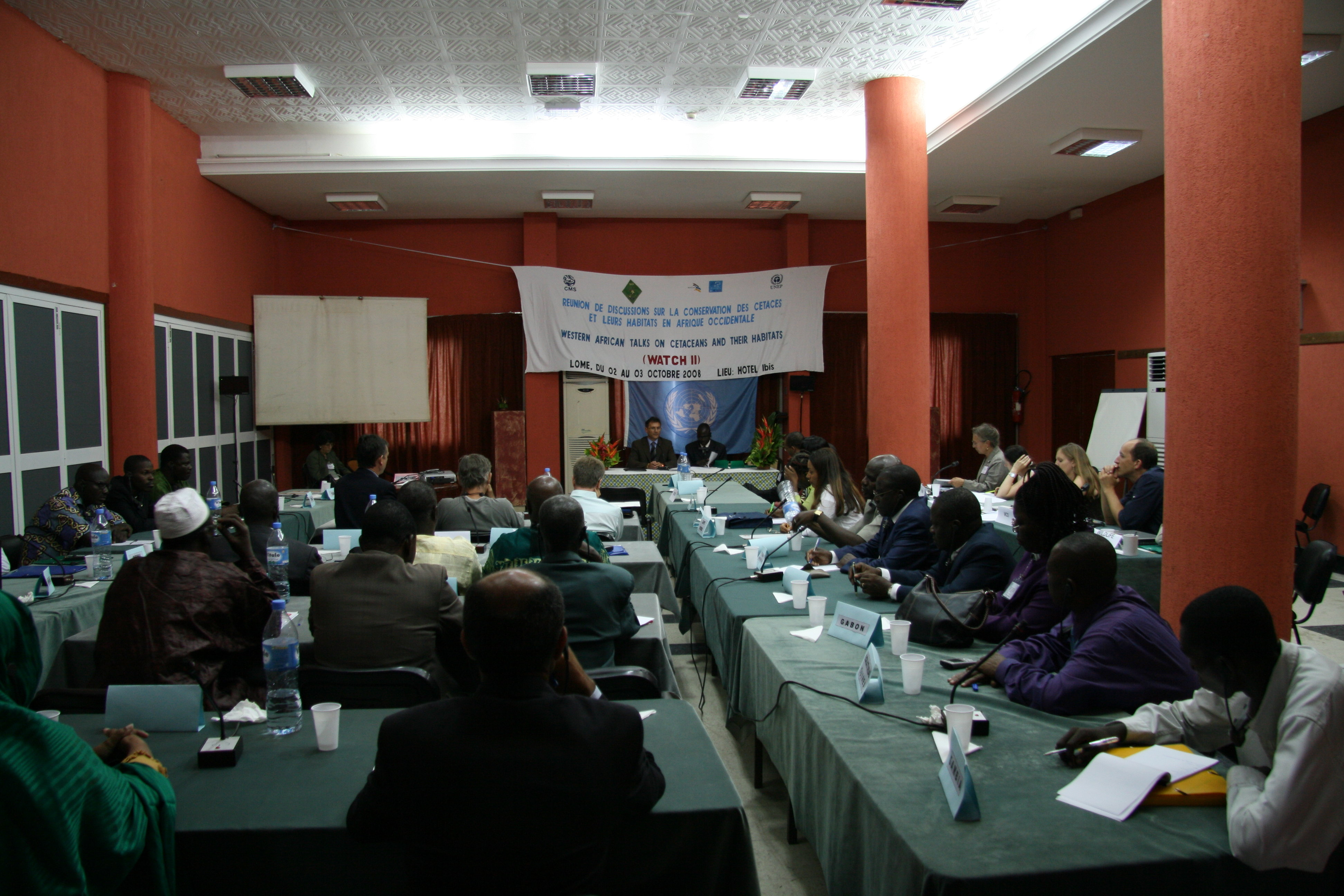
WATCH II meeting, Lomé, Togo, October 2008

A first negotiation meeting, called WATCH I (Western African Talks on Cetaceans and their Habitats), held in Adeje, Tenerife, Spain in October 2007 further elaborated on a MoU. One year later, 2–3 October 2008, WATCH II meeting was held in Lomé, Togo. Here, the final negotiation and signing of the MoU took place, including the adoption of two Action Plans, which are annexes to the MoU. The MoU was signed by 15 range States and four organizations and came into effect immediately. Later on, two other range States as well as two organizations also signed the MoU, bringing the total to 23.

Signatories to the West African Aquatic Mammals MoU:

- Angola (3 October 2008)
- Benin (3 October 2008)
- Cape Verde (3 October 2008)
- Chad (3 October 2008)
- Congo (3 October 2008)
- Côte d'Ivoire (3 October 2008)
- Equatorial Guinea (3 October 2008)
- Gabon (3 October 2008)
- Ghana (3 October 2008)
- Guinea-Bissau (3 October 2008)
- Liberia (3 October 2008)
- Mali (3 October 2008)
- Mauritania (3 October 2008)
- Niger (3 October 2008)
- Togo (3 October 2008)
- Portugal (5 December 2008)
- Guinea (8 December 2008)

In addition, the following organizations have signed the MoU:

- Wetlands International Africa (3 October 2008)
- Wildlife Trust (3 October 2008)
- GSM (Society for the Conservation of Marine Mammals) (3 October 2008)
- CMS Secretariat (3 October 2008)
- WDCS (5 December 2008)
- World Wide Fund for Nature (5 December 2008)

== Aim of MoU ==
Direct and incidental catch, coastal development, pollution, over-fishing and habitat degradation are the most immediate threats for West African marine mammal population, causing a rapid decline. The MoU aims to protect these species at a national, regional and global level. Efforts to protect marine mammals and raise awareness of their conservation needs include convening of meetings, undertaking of studies and filed activities, adoption of legal instruments, as well as the development of international agreements.

== Species covered by MoU ==
The MoU protects the West African manatee (Trichechus senegalensis) and all populations of small cetaceans including the endemic Atlantic humpback dolphin (Sousa teuszi). About thirty species are thought to occur in the region of West Africa and Macaronesia.

== Fundamental components ==
Concerned by the conservation status of the manatees and small cetacean populations frequently visiting the coastal and inland waters of the region’s Western African range States, the range States decide to work closely together to achieve and maintain a favorable conservation status for the species and their habitats. To this end they will, individually or collectively:

1. Take steps as range States for the respective species to conserve manatees and small cetaceans and fully protect those species listed in CMS Appendix I that occur in the region
2. Consider, as appropriate, ratifying or acceding to those biodiversity-related international instruments that complement the intent of the MoU, including in particular CMS, so as to enhance the legal protection of the species
3. Enact or update, as appropriate, legislation and enforce it to conserve the species concerned
4. Implement the provisions of the Action Plans attached as annexes to the MoU
5. Facilitate the rapid exchange of scientific, technical and legal information necessary to coordinate conservation measures, and cooperate with recognized experts and collaborating organizations to facilitate the work conducted in relation to the Action Plans
6. Assess the implementation of the MoU and Action Plans at regular meetings
7. Submit regularly to the Secretariat reports on implementation of the MoU

The MoU took effect following the signature by the seventh range State (3 October 2008) and will remain in effect indefinitely subject to the right of any Signatory to terminate its participation by providing one year’s written notice to all other Signatories.

== Meetings ==
Meetings of Signatories are organized regularly to review the conservation status of manatees and small cetaceans and the implementation of the MoU and Action Plans. National reports by individual Signatories and a report prepared by the secretariat are also submitted. As of August 2012, the first Meeting of Signatories is yet to take place.

== Secretariat ==
The CMS Secretariat – located in Bonn, Germany – acts as the secretariat to the MoU. The secretariat organizes the regular meetings and prepares overview report compiled on the basis of information at its disposal.

== Action Plans ==
The MoU is accompanied by two Action Plans, one for manatees and one for small cetaceans.

The Acton Plan for the African manatee, the least intensively studied of the Sirenians, aims to improve legislation for manatee protection, improve applied research, reduce pressures and promote a wide appreciation of the animal and their ecological and cultural value through communication and education.

The Action Plan for small cetaceans contains eight thematic sections: National, Regional and International Collaboration and Cooperation; Legislation and Policy; Ecosystem/Habitat Protection; Threat Reduction; Research and Monitoring; Capacity Building; Education and Awareness; Tourism Based on Small Cetaceans.

== Activities ==
Possibilities are being explored for the development of sub-regional implementation plans, probably through one or more workshops and potentially in collaboration with the University of Ghana. Meanwhile, Guinea has developed Action Plans based on those in the MoU for use in its own context at national level. A database tool modeled on that for the Pacific Islands Cetaceans MoU is being developed by WDCS. Furthermore, an exploratory survey of cetaceans and their status in Cameroon was carried out in 2011, with support from the CMS Small Grants Programme. Finally, two projects are being explored, one for developing a GEF project for implementation of the MoU and one for the establishment of a Technical Advisory Group for the MoU.
