= Lundgrenfjellet =

Mountain in Svalbard, Norway

Coordinates: 77.763°N 16.290°E

Lundgrenfjellet is a mountain in Nathorst Land on Spitsbergen, in Norway's Svalbard archipelago. It has a height of 1,054 m.a.s.l., and is named after Swedish geologist Sven Anders Bernhard Lundgren. The mountain is located south of Van Mijenfjorden, north of the Vengebreen and Rånebreen glaciers, and west of the Danzigdalen valley.
