= Steindolptoppen =

Mountain in Svalbard, Norway

Coordinates: 77.710°N 16.246°E

Steindolptoppen is a mountain in Nathorst Land at Spitsbergen, in Norway's Svalbard archipelago. It has a height of 1,035 m.a.s.l. Nearby mountains are Langlifjellet, Juvtinden and Rånekampen. At the eastern side of Steindolptoppen is the Steindolpbreen glacier.
