= Brogniartfjella =

Mountain ridge in Spitsbergen, Norway

Coordinates: 77.575°N 15.881°E

Brogniartfjella is a mountain ridge in Nathorst Land on Spitsbergen, part of Norway's Svalbard archipelago. The ridge is located at the north side of Van Keulenfjorden. It has a length of about eight kilometers, and its highest peak is 904 m.a.s.l. The ridge is named after French paleontologist Adolphe-Théodore Brongniart. First known ascent dates from 1920. The valley of Wittrockdalen separates Brogniartfjella from Wittrockfjellet.
