= Kassen =

Kassen is a German language surname. Notable people with the name include:

- Adam Kassen (1974), American independent film director, actor, writer and producer
- Mark Kassen (1971), American actor, director and producer
