= Steenstrupbreen =

Glacier in Svalbard, Norway

Coordinates: 77.606°N 16.292°E

Steenstrupbreen is a glacier in Nathorst Land on Spitsbergen, the largest island of Norway's Svalbard archipelago. It has a length of about 8.5 kilometers, and is situated northeast of the valley of Steenstrupdalen. The glacier is named after Danish geologist and Arctic explorer Knud Johannes Vogelius Steenstrup. The mountain of Marlowfjellet separates Steenstrupbreen from Sysselmannbreen.
