= Pacific Islands Cetaceans Memorandum of Understanding =

2006 memorandum protecting cetaceans in the Pacific Ocean

Memorandum of Understanding for the Conservation of Cetaceans and their Habitats in the Pacific Islands Region
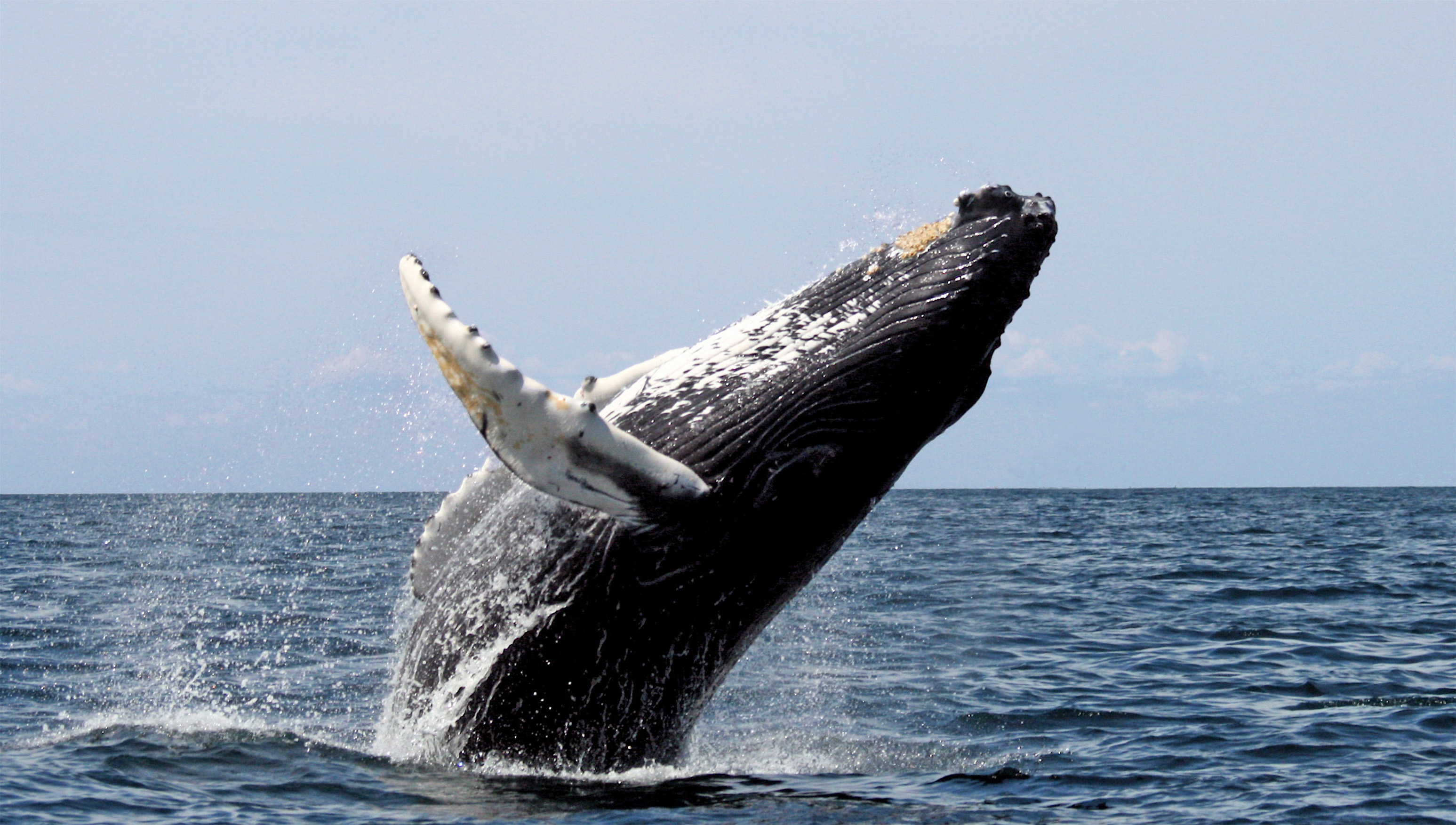
- Context: nature conservation
- Effective: 15 September 2006
- Signatories: Australia; Cook Islands; Federated States of Micronesia; Fiji; France; New Zealand; Niue; Samoa; Vanuatu; Papua New Guinea; Solomon Islands; United Kingdom; United States of America; Tonga; Tuvalu
- Languages: English and French

The Memorandum of Understanding (MoU) for the Conservation of Cetaceans and their Habitats in the Pacific Island Region is a Multilateral Environmental Memorandum of Understanding concluded under the auspices of the Convention on Migratory Species of Wild Animals (CMS), also known as the Bonn Convention, and in collaboration with the Pacific Regional Environment Programme (SPREP). The MoU provides an international framework for coordinated conservation efforts to improve the conservation status of the Pacific Islands Cetaceans and came into effect on 15 September 2006.

The MoU covers 22 range States (Australia, Cook Islands, Federated States of Micronesia, Fiji, French Polynesia, Kiribati, Marshall Islands, Nauru, New Caledonia (to France), New Zealand, Niue, Palau, Papua New Guinea, Samoa, Solomon Islands, Tokelau, Tonga, Tuvalu, United Kingdom (Pitcairn Island), United States (including American Samoa, Guam and the Northern Mariana Islands), Vanuatu and Wallis and Futuna (to France)). As of September 2012, 15 States had signed the MoU as well as a number of co-operating organisations.

== Development of the MoU ==
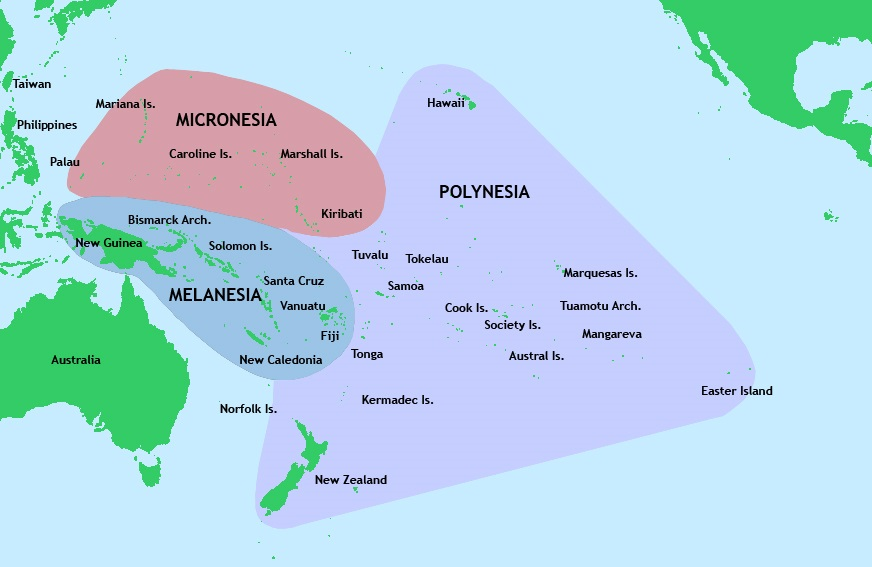
Map Pacific Islands Region

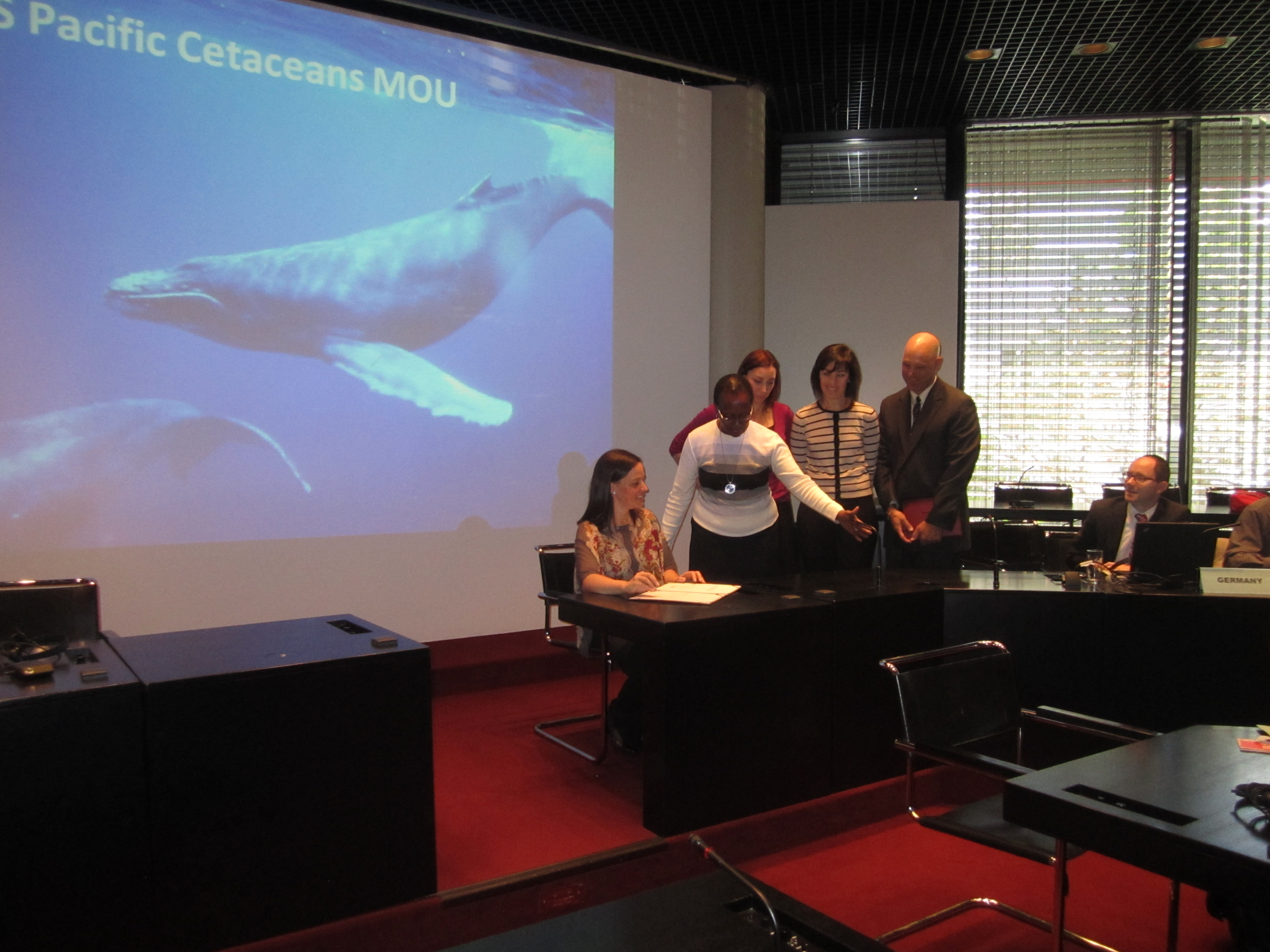
Signing of the Pacific Islands Cetaceans MoU by the United States (Shannon Dionne), Bonn, Germany, 27 September 2012

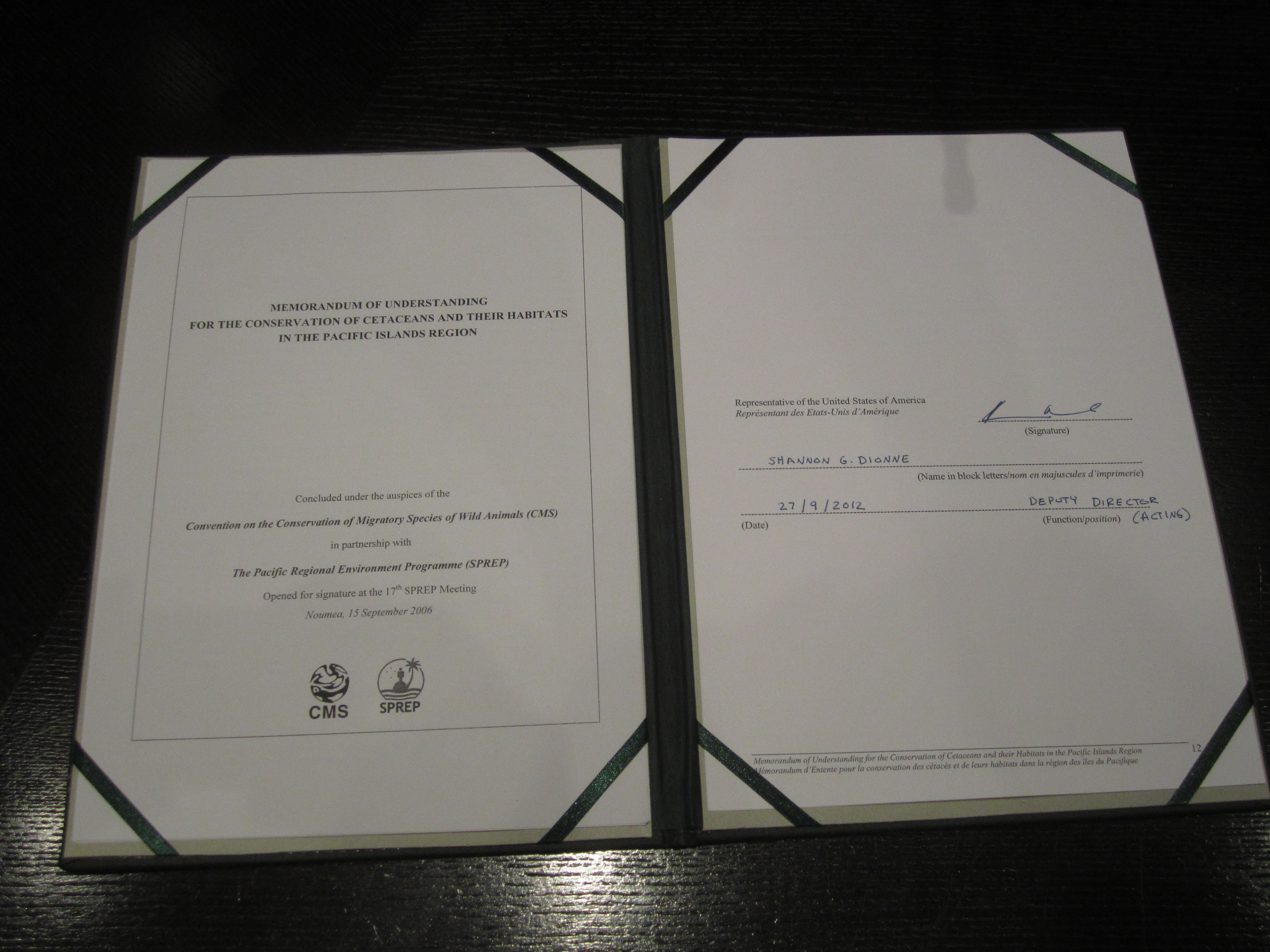
Official signature by the United States

Whales and dolphins (cetaceans) migrate over large distances, connecting ocean ecosystems and cultures throughout the Pacific Islands Region. Despite restrictions on commercial hunting imposed by the International Whaling Commission, such as the international moratorium on whaling, populations have not recovered to pre-whaling levels, and many species are listed in the highest risk categories of the IUCN Red List. To provide a framework for governments, scientists and other to monitor and co-ordinate conservation efforts, a MoU was launched on 15 September 2006.

Signatories to the Pacific Islands Cetaceans MoU:

- Australia (15 September 2006)
- Cook Islands (15 September 2006)
- Federated States of Micronesia (15 September 2006)
- Fiji (15 September 2006)
- France (15 September 2006)
- New Zealand (15 September 2006)
- Niue (15 September 2006)
- Samoa (15 September 2006)
- Vanuatu (15 September 2006)
- Papua New Guinea (6 March 2007)
- Solomon Islands (6 March 2007)
- United Kingdom, Pitcairn Island (29 July 2009)
- Tonga (9 September 2010)
- Tuvalu (9 September 2010)
- United States of America (27 September 2012)

In addition, the following organisations have signed the MoU:

- CMS Secretariat (15 September 2006)
- Pacific Regional Environment Programme (SPREP) Secretariat (15 September 2006)
- International Fund for Animal Welfare (15 September 2006)
- Whale and Dolphin Conservation Society (15 September 2006)
- WWF International (6 March 2007)
- Whales Alive (29 July 2009)
- South Pacific Whale Research Consortium (29 July 2009)

Although most of the signatories have only small land areas, they are of the highest importance since they are surrounded by huge Exclusive Economic Zones, covering millions of square kilometres of sea, which the cetaceans use as migration routes.

== Aim of MoU ==
The survival of many cetacean populations that frequent the waters of the Pacific Islands Region, particularly those that have been severely depleted, can be affected by numerous threats, such as interaction with fisheries, hunting, pollution, collision with boats, noise, habitat degradation, climate change, disruption of food chains and irresponsible tourism. The aim of the MoU is to address all of these threats through co-operation between the range States.

== Species covered by the MoU ==
The MoU protects all populations of cetaceans (whales and dolphins) in the Pacific Island Region (area between the Tropic of Cancer and 60° South latitude and between 130° east longitude and 120° West longitude). Some of the species occurring in the Pacific Islands Region are:

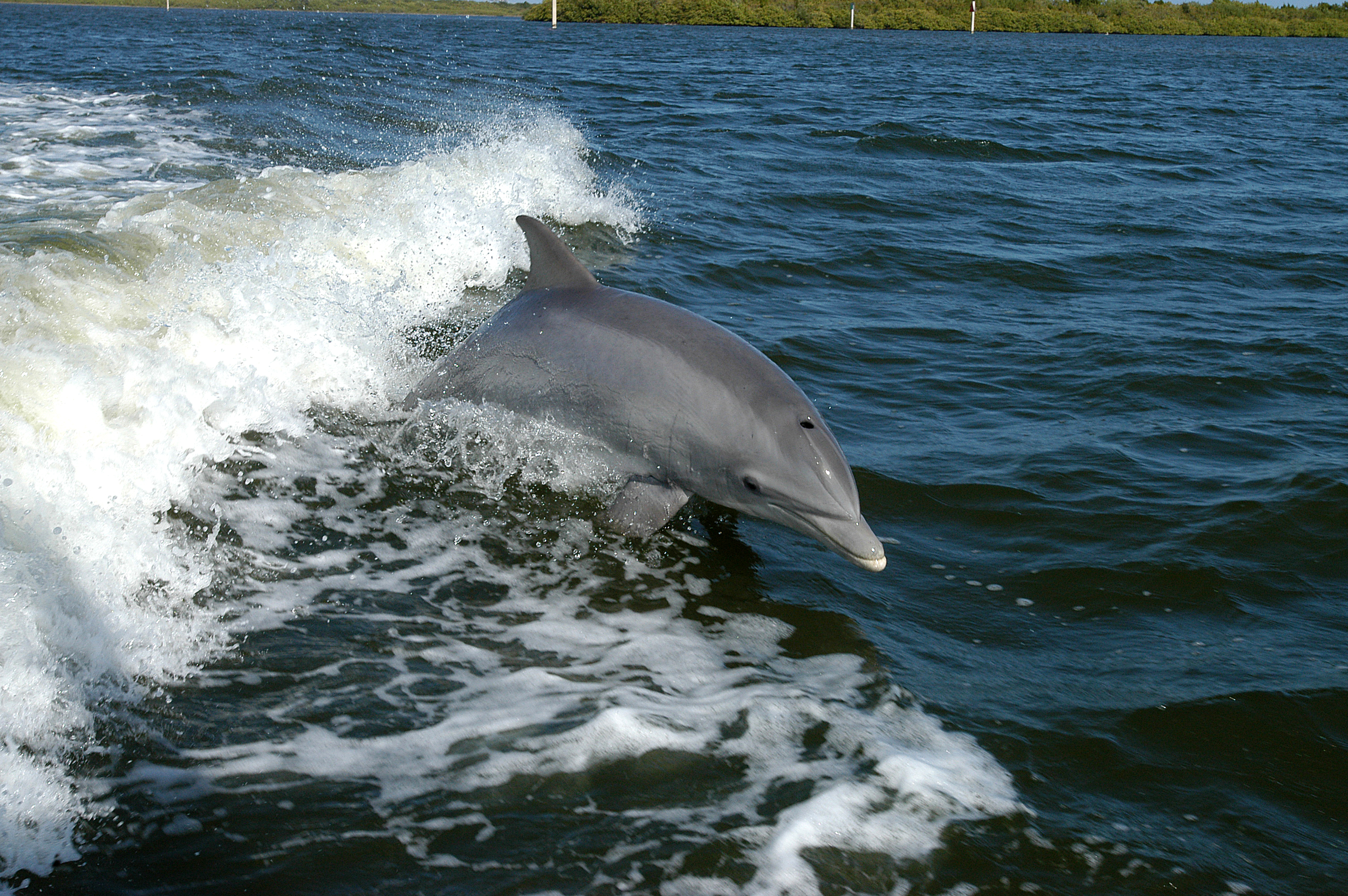
Bottlenose Dolphin

- Minke whales
- Sei whale
- "Bryde's-like" whales
- Blue whales
- Fin whale
- Humpback whale
- Pygmy killer whale
- Short-finned pilot whale
- Orca
- Striped dolphin
- Bottlenose dolphins
- Common dolphins
- Sperm whale

== Fundamental components ==
The signatories acknowledge the shared responsibility of states, territories, intergovernmental organisations and the non-governmental sector to achieve and maintain a favourable conservation status for cetaceans and their habitats in the Pacific Island Region. To this end, the signatories decided to work closely together and to foster co-operation, build capacity and ensure coordinated region-wide actions. Therefore, they will, individually or collectively:

1. Take steps to conserve all cetaceans and fully protect species listed in CMS Appendix I that occur in the Pacific Islands Region
2. Consider, as appropriate, ratifying or acceding to those biodiversity-related international instruments that complement the MoU
3. Review, enact or update, as appropriate, legislation to conserve cetaceans
4. Implement the provision of the Action Plan, annexed to the MoU as a basis to conserve all populations of cetaceans in the Pacific Islands Region
5. Facilitate the rapid exchange of scientific, technical and legal information necessary to co-ordinate conservation measures and to co-operate with recognised experts, collaborating organisations and Territories concerned so as to facilitate the work conducted in relation to the Action Plan
6. Assess the implementation of the MoU and Action Plan at regular meetings
7. Provide the Secretariat a regular report on the implementation of the MoU

The MoU took effect immediately after the fourth signature (15 September 2006) and will remain in effect indefinitely subject to the right of any signatory to terminate its participation by providing one year's written notice to all other signatories.

== Meetings ==
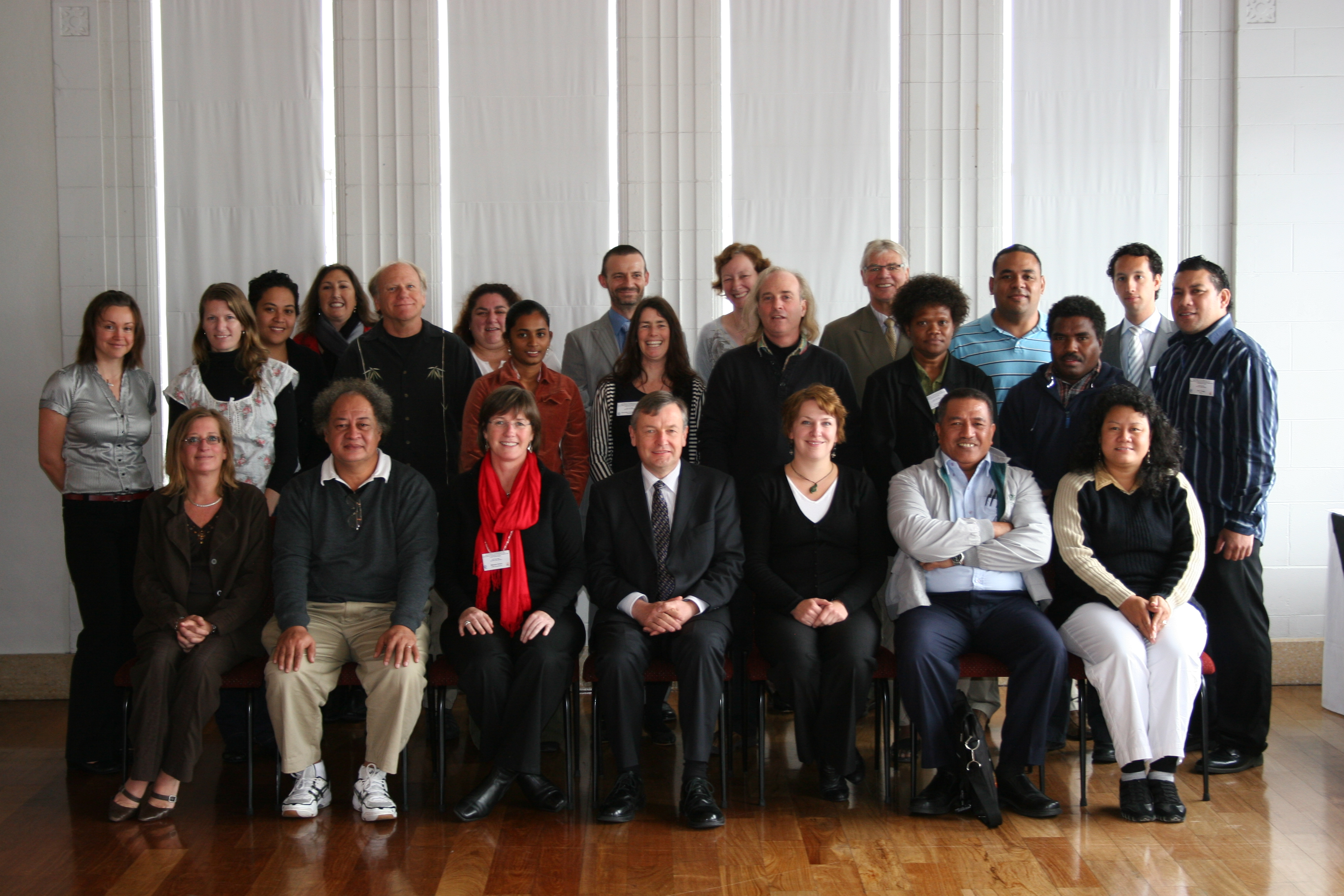
Second Meeting of Signatories to the Pacific Islands Cetaceans MoU, Auckland, New Zealand, 28–29 July 2009

Meetings of Signatories are organised regularly to review the conservation status of the species and the implementation of the MoU and Action Plan. At the meetings there is also a possibility to sign the MoU.

The First Meeting of Signatories took place in Apia, Samoa, 6 March 2007. During the meeting representative of two range States, Papua New Guinea and Solomon Islands, signed the MoU. Furthermore, the conservation status of the Pacific Islands Cetaceans was reviewed, as well as the implementation of the MoU and Action Plan. All the current Signatories were represented at the meeting. Non-Signatory range States present during the meeting were Tonga, Kiribati, Tuvalu and the United States as well as several NGO's such as IFAW and WDCS.

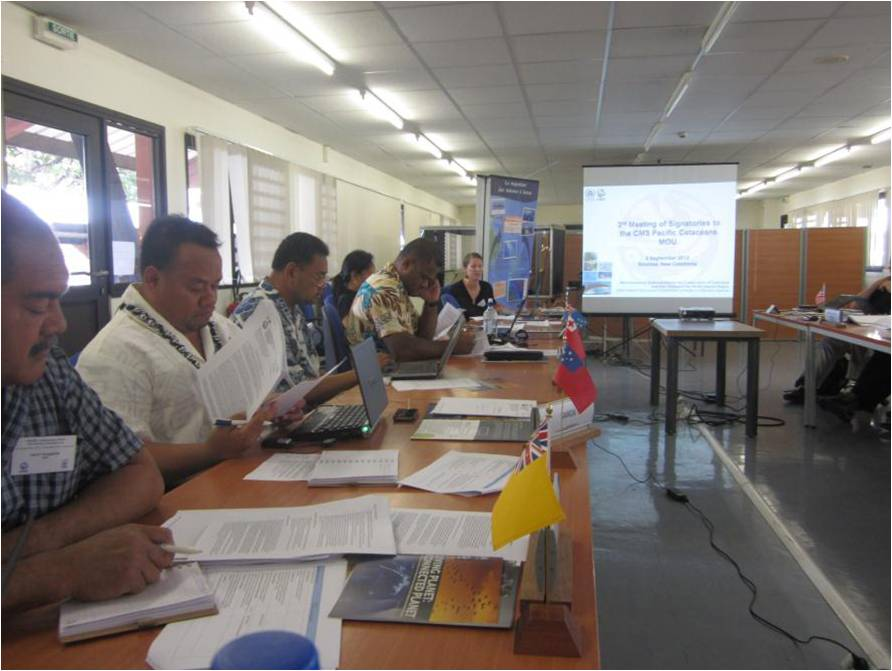
Third Meeting of Signatories to the Pacific Islands Cetaceans MoU, Nouméa, New Caledonia, 8 September 2012

The Second Meeting of Signatories was held in Auckland, New Zealand, 28–29 July 2009. At the meeting the Pitcairn Islands, the South Pacific Whale Research Consortium and Whales Alive were added to the Signatories. A proposal, subject to funding, was endorsed to appoint an officier to be based at SPREP to co-ordinate the MoU and to be responsible for CMS activities throughout the region. Moreover, the meeting adopted a Whale and Dolphin Action Plan 2009–2012, based on a similar document developed by SPREP, as an Action Plan for the MoU. The plan emphasis on increasing capacity, awareness and understanding in the region. It outlines how communities can benefit from whale-and dolphin-based tourism. A proposal to develop an Oceania Humpback Whale Recovery Plan was also endorsed. Finally, a Technical Advisory Group for the MoU was formed, consisting of nine specialist experts in the science of cetacean conservation, coordinated with WDCS.

The Third Meeting of Signatories took place in Nouméa, New Caledonia, 8 September 2012. The meeting focused on the following subjects:

- Adopt the SPREP regional Whale and Dolphin Action Plan 2013–2017 for the MoU
- Review the status of implementation of the MoU and Action Plan
- Set future priorities for the MoU
- Discuss strengthened collaboration at the national, regional and international level for the implementation of the MoU and Action Plan.

== Secretariat ==
The CMS Secretariat – located in Bonn, Germany – acts as the secretariat to the MoU. The secretariat transmits reports received from Signatories to the other States, Territories concerned and any collaborating organisations together with an overview report that it compiles on the basis of the information at its disposal.

== Action plan ==
CMS's key partner SPREP developed a Whale and Dolphin Action Plan, which was adopted in 2003 and was revised in 2007. This plan was appended to the MoU and formed the basis for on-the-ground conservation efforts throughout the region. In 2009, at the Second Meeting of Signatories, an Amending Protocol was adopted which replaced the Action Plan 2003–2007 in Annex 2 to the MoU with the Whale and Dolphin Action Plan 2009–2012, which is based on the SPREP Whale and Dolphin Action Plan. The Action Plans focus on the following subjects:

- Threat reduction
- Habitat protection, including migratory corridors
- Research an monitoring
- Education and public awareness
- Information exchange
- Capacity building
- Responses to strandings and entanglements
- Sustainable and responsible cetacean-based tourism
- International co-operation

The Third Meeting of Signatories endorsed a recovery plan for the endangered humpback whale population in Oceania, and adopted a five-year Action Plan (2013–2017), previously adopted by SPREP members, for the MoU, outlining priorities for addressing threats, as well as increasing capacity and public awareness in the region.

== Activities and achievement ==
Implementation activities in different parts of the region have included:

- Research and survey work, including on entanglement of large whales in fishing gear and mitigation options. For example, the Fiji Humpback Research Project
- Assessment of the conservation status of cetaceans and the socio-economic value of cetacean conservation
- Interdepartmental collaboration over ship strikes and ocean noise
- New marine sanctuaries
- Development of the Pacific Islands Whale and Dolphin Watching Guidelines
- Capacity building workshops and development of licensing systems for whale watching operators
- Alignment of national legislation with the MoU

The Year of the Dolphin 2007–2008 campaign achieved a major outreach effort by CMS and its cetacean-related agreements worldwide.

The Government of Samoa, with co-funding from the CMS Secretariat, drawing on a voluntary contribution from Australia, conducted a cetacean survey in 2010 which confirmed the importance of Samoan waters for Humpback whales and other Cetacean species such as Spinner dolphins.

== Pacific Islands Cetaceans MoU Diversity Database ==
As part of the Partnership Agreement between WDCS and CMS an online Diversity Database was developed and is now fully online. This multilingual tool makes Country/Territory and species specific information freely and easily available to all Pacific Islands Governments, tracking information like habitat type, behaviour during the sighting, number of animals per sighting and any threats that might be related if the sighting is a stranding. CMS and CITES Appendices listings are also noted, as well as meeting reports and photos if available.
