= Danzigdalen =

Valley of Spitsbergen, Norway

Coordinates: 77.7526°N 16.4498°E

Danzigdalen is a valley in Nathorst Land on Spitsbergen island, in Norway's Svalbard archipelago. It is located south of Van Mijenfjorden, extending northwards from Svalbreen to Danzigøyra, with a total length of about 11.5 kilometers. At the western side of the valley are the mountains of Lundgrenfjellet and Vengefjellet, and to the east are Fagerstafjella.
