= Bromelldalen =

Valley of Spitsbergen, Norway

- Location within Svalbard
- Length: 8 km (5.0 mi)

Geology
- Type: Valley

Geography
- Location: Nathorst Land at Spitsbergen, Svalbard
- Coordinates: 77.715°N 15.900°E
- Interactive map of Bromelldalen

Bromelldalen is a valley in Nathorst Land at Spitsbergen, Svalbard. It has a length of about eight kilometers, and is located between the mountains of Sven Nilssonfjellet and Bassøefjellet on the eastern side, and Hisingerfjellet to the west, at the southern side of Van Mijenfjorden. The valley is named after Swedish botanist Olof Bromelius.
