= Davisodden =

River delta fed by several glaciers named after Geomorphologists William Morris Davis

- Cape
- Coordinates: 77°34′34″N 15°42′07″E
- Location: Nathorst Land, Spitsbergen, Svalbard, Norway

Davisodden is a headland in Nathorst Land at Spitsbergen, Svalbard. It is named after American geomorphologist William Morris Davis. The headland is located at the northern side of Van Keulenfjorden, and is a river delta made by the river flowing through Davisdalen. Davisdalen extends from the mountain ridge of Mjellegga down to Davisodden. Its river is fed from several glaciers, including Martinbreen and Charpentierbreen.

== Former name ==
The headland was formerly called Kapp Dunér, and was renamed to avoid confusion with Kapp Dunér at the island of Bjørnøya.
