= Törnbohmfjella =

Mountain range in Svalbard, Norway

Coordinates: 77.619°N 15.4881°E

Törnbohmfjella is a mountain range in Nathorst Land at Spitsbergen, Svalbard. The range is named after the Swedish geologist Alfred Elis Törnebohm. It covers an area about nine kilometers long and six kilometers wide, bordering on Van Keulenfjorden, Davisdalen, Martinbreen, Richterbreen and Richterdalen. Its highest mountain peak is Såta (958 m.a.s.l.), and it also comprises Pallfjellet, Kolthoffberget, Ekholmfjellet and Venetzhumpen. The glaciers of Charpentierbreen and Venetzbreen are located within the mountain range of Törnbohmfjella.
