= Bakaninbreen =

Glacier at Spitsbergen, Svalbard, Norway

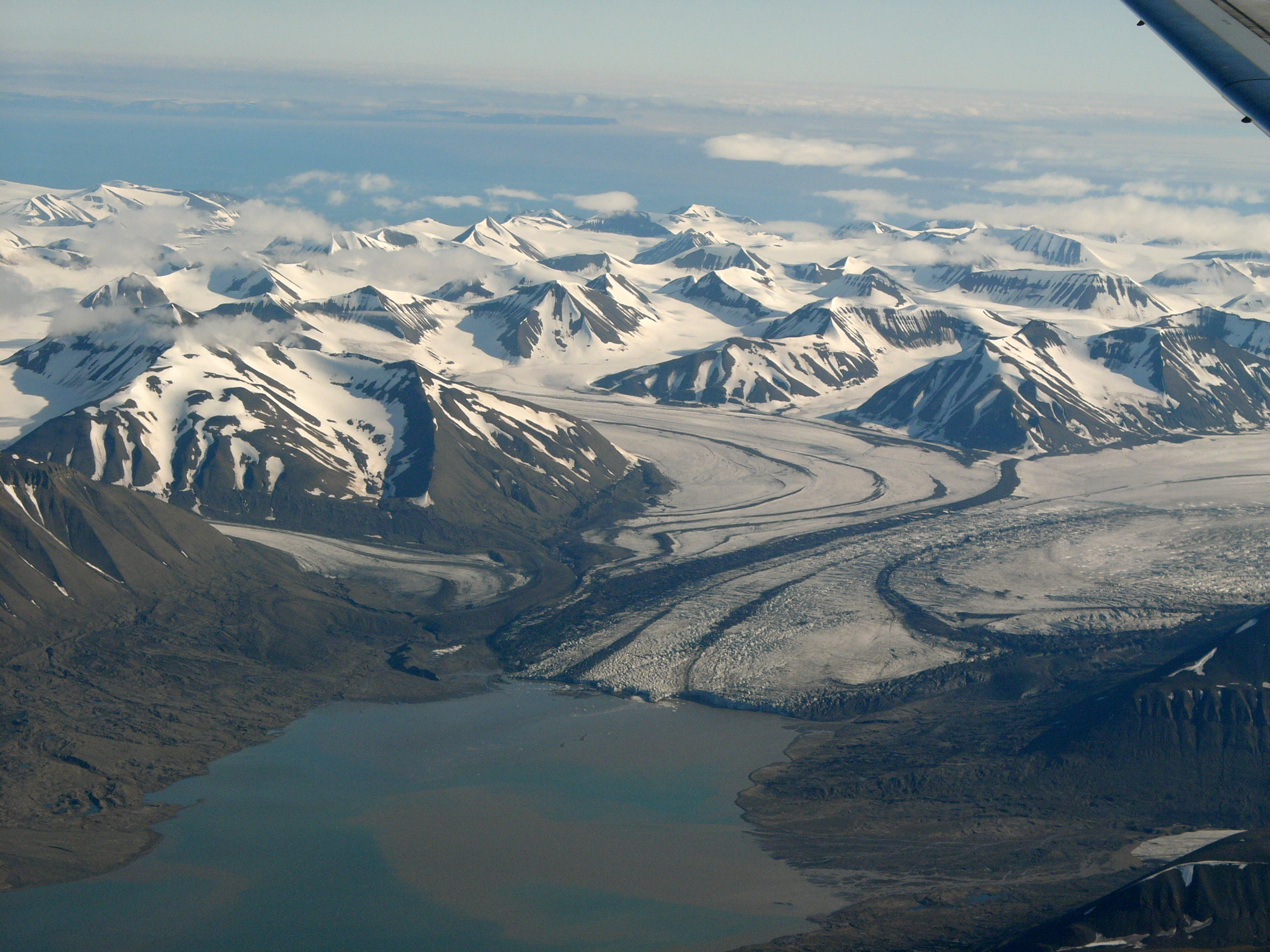
- Bakaninbreen merges with Paulabreen before the combined glacier debouches into the bay of Rindersbukta.

- Location within Svalbard
- Type: Glacier
- Location: Heer Land; Spitsbergen, Svalbard
- Coordinates: 77.764°N 17.500°E
- Length: 9.5 km (5.9 mi)
- Terminus: Rindersbukta

Bakaninbreen is a glacier in Heer Land at Spitsbergen, Svalbard, Norway. It has a length of about 9.5 kilometers, and merges with the glacier of Paulabreen. The glacier is named after a member of the Swedish-Russian Arc-of-Meridian Expedition. The mountain of Hollertoppen is located between Bakaninbreen and Ragna-Mariebreen.
