= Mjellegga =

Coordinates: 77.644°N 15.708°E

Mjellegga ("the dry snow ridge") is a mountain ridge in Nathorst Land at Spitsbergen, Svalbard. It has a length of about 3.5 kilometers, and its highest peak is 785 m.a.s.l. Surrounding glaciers are Mjellfonna, Greenbreen and Martinbreen. The valley of Davisdalen extends from Mjellegga down to the headland of Davisodden, at the northern side of Van Keulenfjorden.
