= Kjellmanberget =

Mountain in Svalbard, Norway

Coordinates: 77.658°N 15.476°E

Kjellmanberget is a mountain ridge in Nathorst Land at Spitsbergen, Svalbard. It is named after the Swedish botanist and Arctic explorer Frans Reinhold Kjellman. The ridge has a length of about five kilometers, extending from Gyllensköldfjellet eastwards to Breskarvet. Its highest peak is 795 m.a.s.l. Surrounding glaciers are Richterbreen, Frysjabreen and Instebreen.
