= Paulabreen =

Glacier at Spitsbergen, Svalbard, Norway

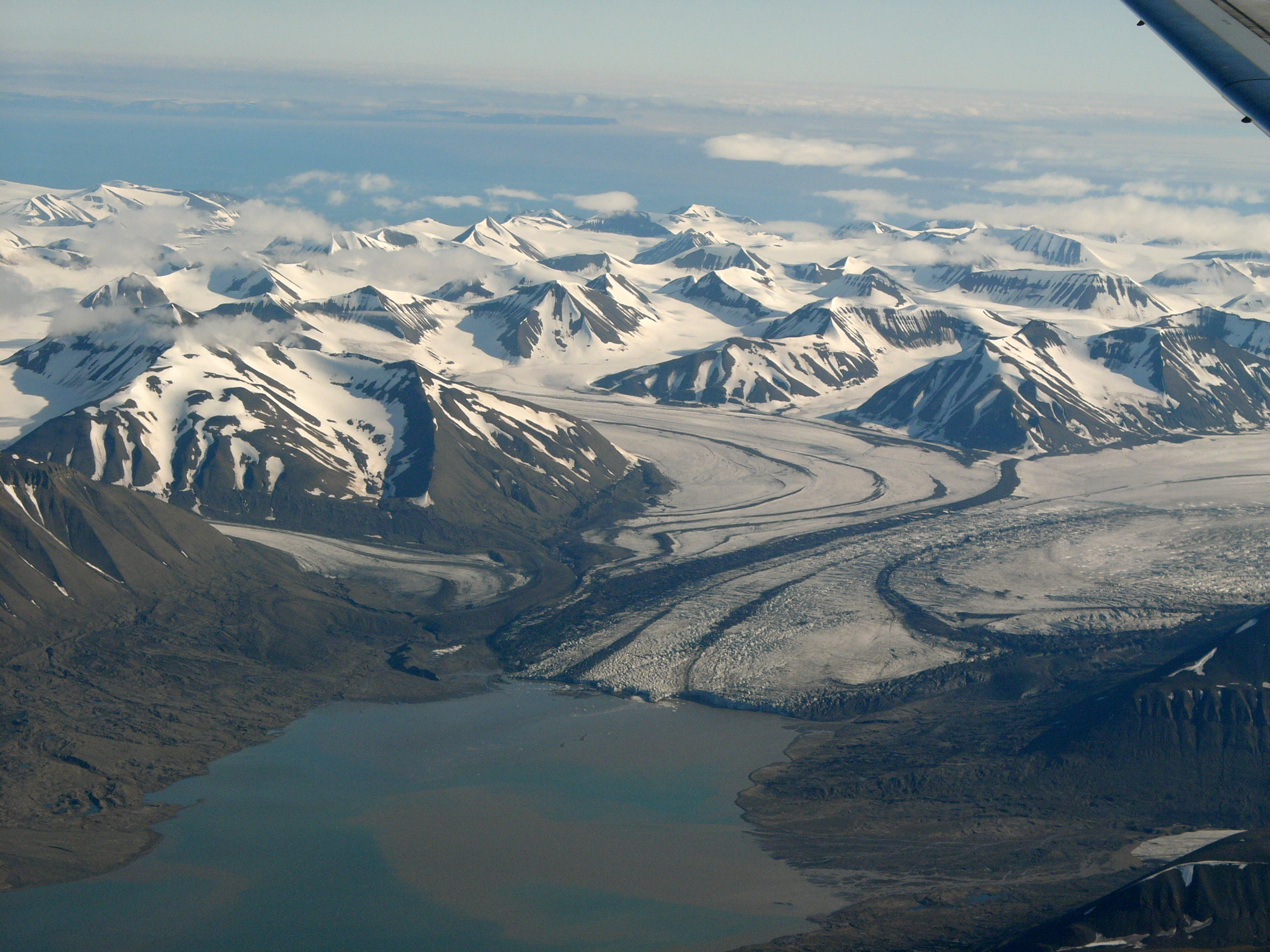
- Paulabreen debouches into Rindersbukta.

- Location within Svalbard
- Type: Glacier
- Location: Nathorst Land and Heer Land; Spitsbergen, Svalbard
- Coordinates: 77.73°N 17.30°E
- Length: 15 km (9.3 mi)
- Terminus: Rindersbukta

Paulabreen is a glacier in Nathorst Land and Heer Land at Spitsbergen, Svalbard. It has a length of about fifteen kilometers, extending from the mountain of Kjølberget to the bay of Rindersbukta. The glacier is named after Paula, the wife of shipmaster Richard Ritter von Barry. Paulabreen borders to the mountain area of Vriompeisen, and the mountain of Hollertoppen. A tributary glacier is Bakaninbreen.
