= Hollertoppen =

Mountain in Svalbard, Norway

Coordinates: 77.774°N 17.398°E

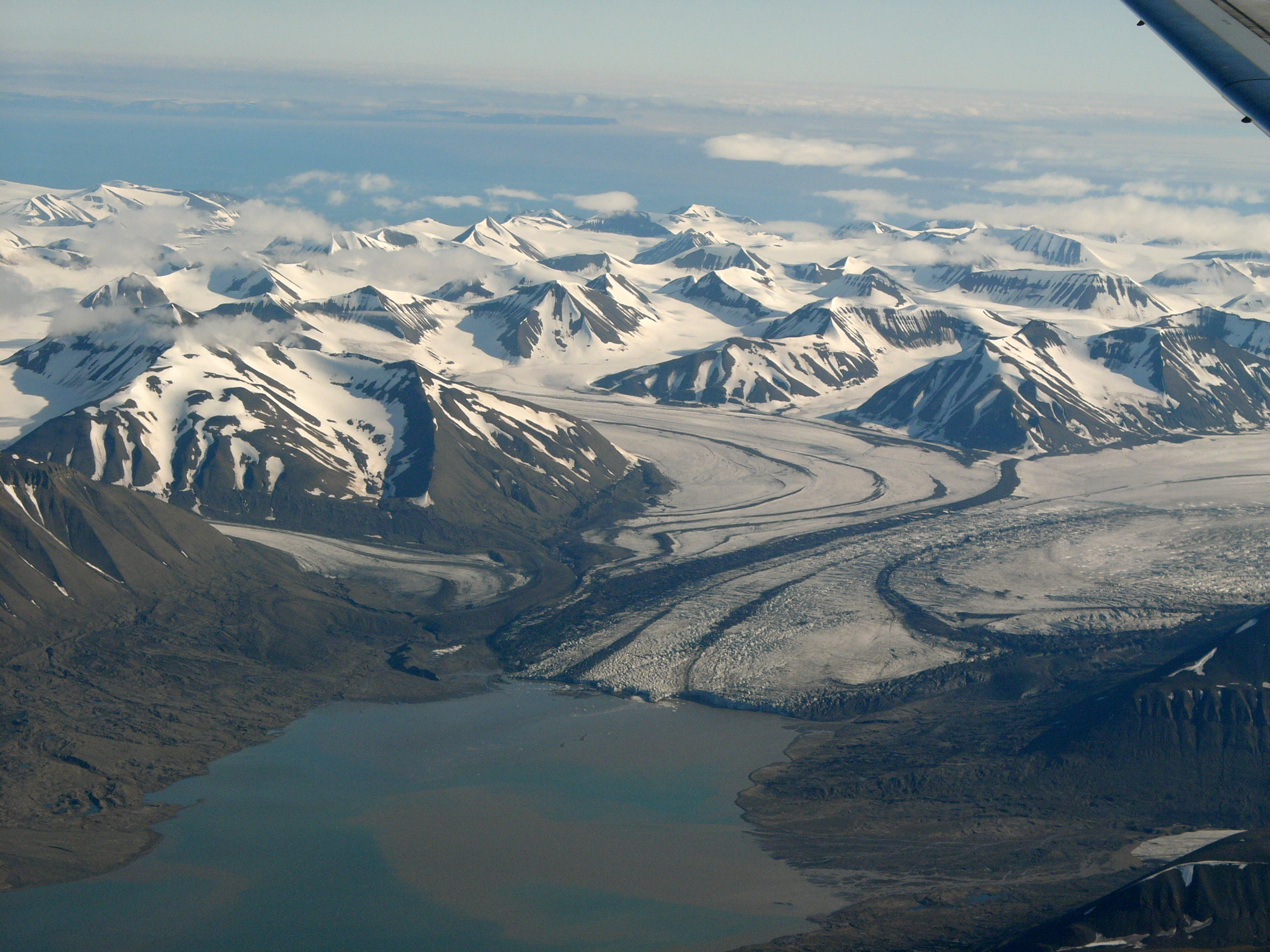
Hollertoppen to the left, between Bakaninbreen and Ragna-Mariebreen

Hollertoppen is a mountain in Heer Land at Spitsbergen, in the Norwegian archipelago of Svalbard in the Arctic Ocean.

It has a height of 1,012 m.a.s.l., and is located between the glaciers of Bakaninbreen and Ragna-Mariebreen, north of Paulabreen. The mountain is named after Norwegian Minister of Industry Kjell Holler.
