= Aspelintoppen =

Mountain in Spitsbergen, Norway

- Location within Svalbard

Highest point
- Elevation: 1,221 m (4,006 ft)
- Coordinates: 77.7695°N 16.6560°E

Geography
- Location: Nathorst Land, Spitsbergen, Norway

Aspelintoppen is the highest mountain of Nathorst Land at Spitsbergen, in the Norwegian archipelago of Svalbard. The mountain has a height of 1,221 m.a.s.l. and is located within Fagerstafjella, to the north of Nobeltoppen. It is named after Swedish industrialist Christian Henrik Thomas Aspelin.
