= Fagerstafjella =

Mountain group in Spitsbergen, Norway

Coordinates: 77.7645°N 16.6436°E

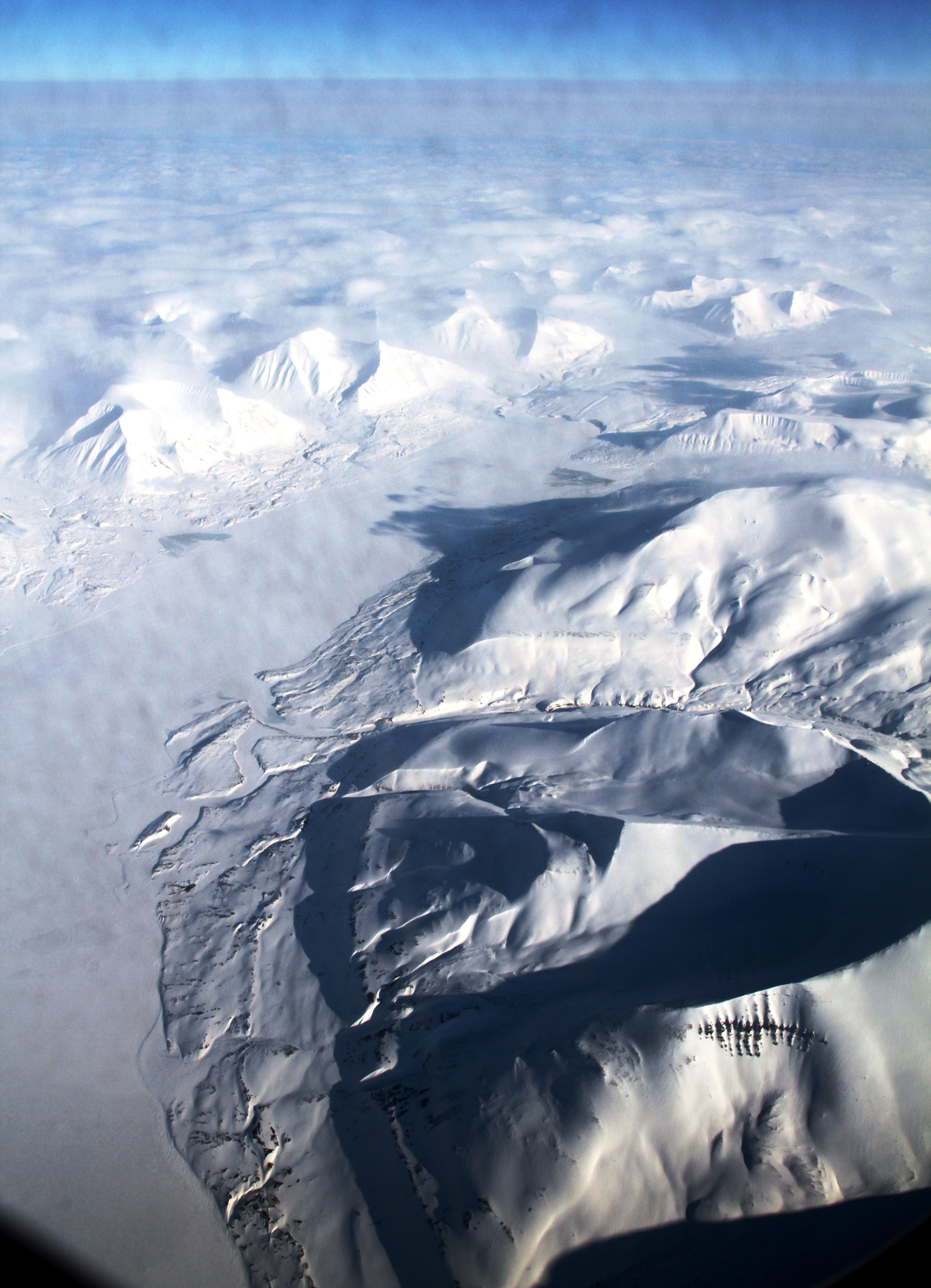
Fagerstafjella

Fagerstafjella is a mountain group in Nathorst Land at Spitsbergen, Svalbard. The group is located south of Van Mijenfjorden, between Scheelebreen and Danzigdalen. The highest mountain in the group is Aspelintoppen, which is also the highest mountain in Nathorst Land.
