= Breskarvet =

Mountain ridge in Spitsbergen, Norway

Coordinates: 77.657°N 15.645°E

Breskarvet is a mountain ridge in Nathorst Land at Spitsbergen, Svalbard. It has a length of about six kilometres. It is situated north of the mountain range of Törnbohmfjella, and south of Krylen. Surrounding glaciers are Martinbreen, Richterbreen, Frysjabreen, Skarvisen and Greenbreen.
