= Charpentierbreen =

Glacier in Svalbard, Norway

Coordinates: 77.618°N 15.541°E

Charpentierbreen is a glacier in Nathorst Land at Spitsbergen, Svalbard. It is named after Swiss geologist Jean de Charpentier. The glacier has a length of about four kilometers, and is located within the mountain range of Törnbohmfjella, flowing eastwards from the peak of Såta down to the valley of Davisdalen. The mountain of Venetzhumpen separates Charpentierbreen from Venetzbreen.
