= Jean de Charpentier =

German-Swiss geologist

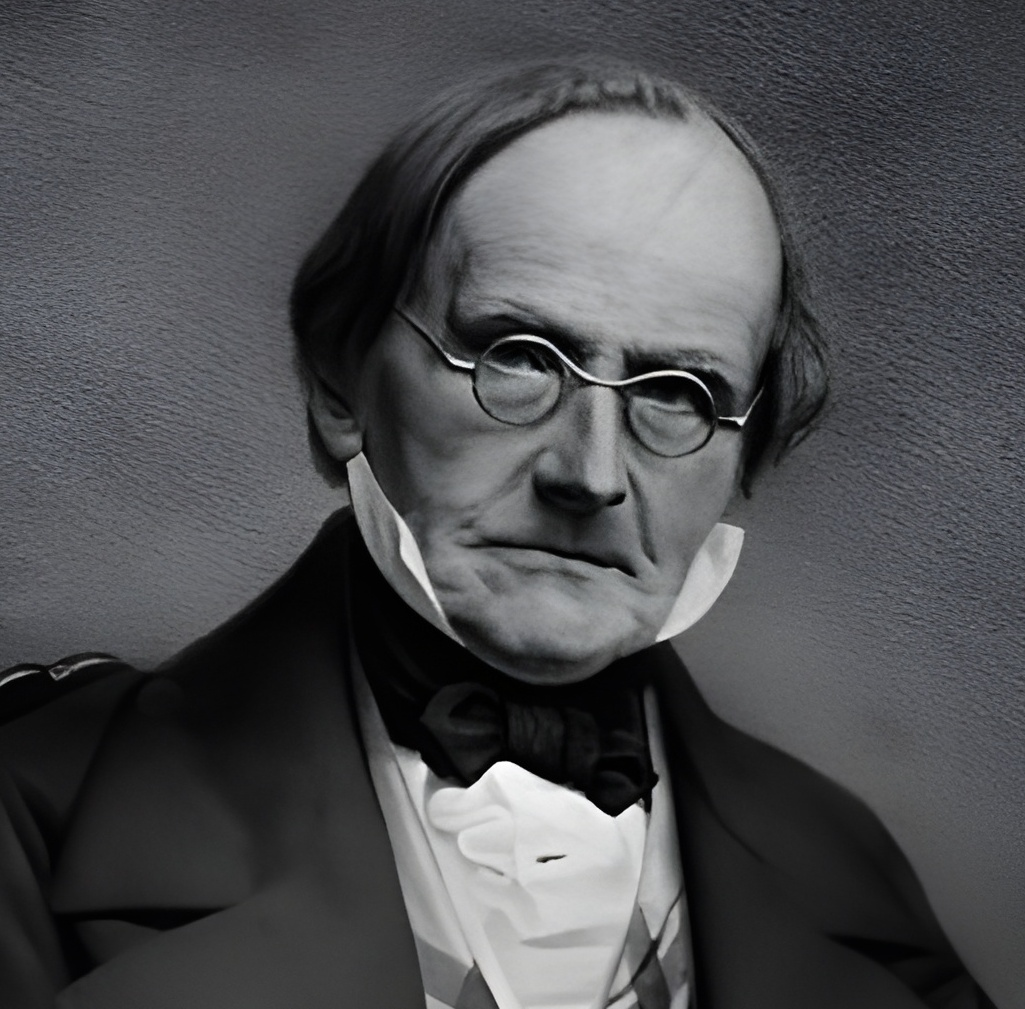
Jean de Charpentier

Jean de Charpentier or Johann von Charpentier (8 December 1786 – 12 December 1855) was a German-Swiss geologist who studied Swiss glaciers. He was born in Freiberg, Electorate of Saxony, Holy Roman Empire and died in Bex, Switzerland.

== Life ==
After following in his father's footsteps as a mining engineer he excelled in his field while working in the copper mines in the Pyrénées and salt mines in western Switzerland.

In 1818 a catastrophic event changed his life focus when an ice-dammed lake in the Val de Bagnes above Martigny broke through its barrier, causing many deaths. Afterwards, he made extensive field studies in the Alps. Using evidence of erratic boulders and moraines and drawing on the works of Goethe, he hypothesized that Swiss glaciers had once been much more extensive. These boulders, characteristic of glaciers, were strewn as if they were brought there by glaciers that no longer existed. Even so, he wasn't sure how glaciers first formed, moved, or how they disappeared. His ideas were later taken up and developed by Louis Agassiz.

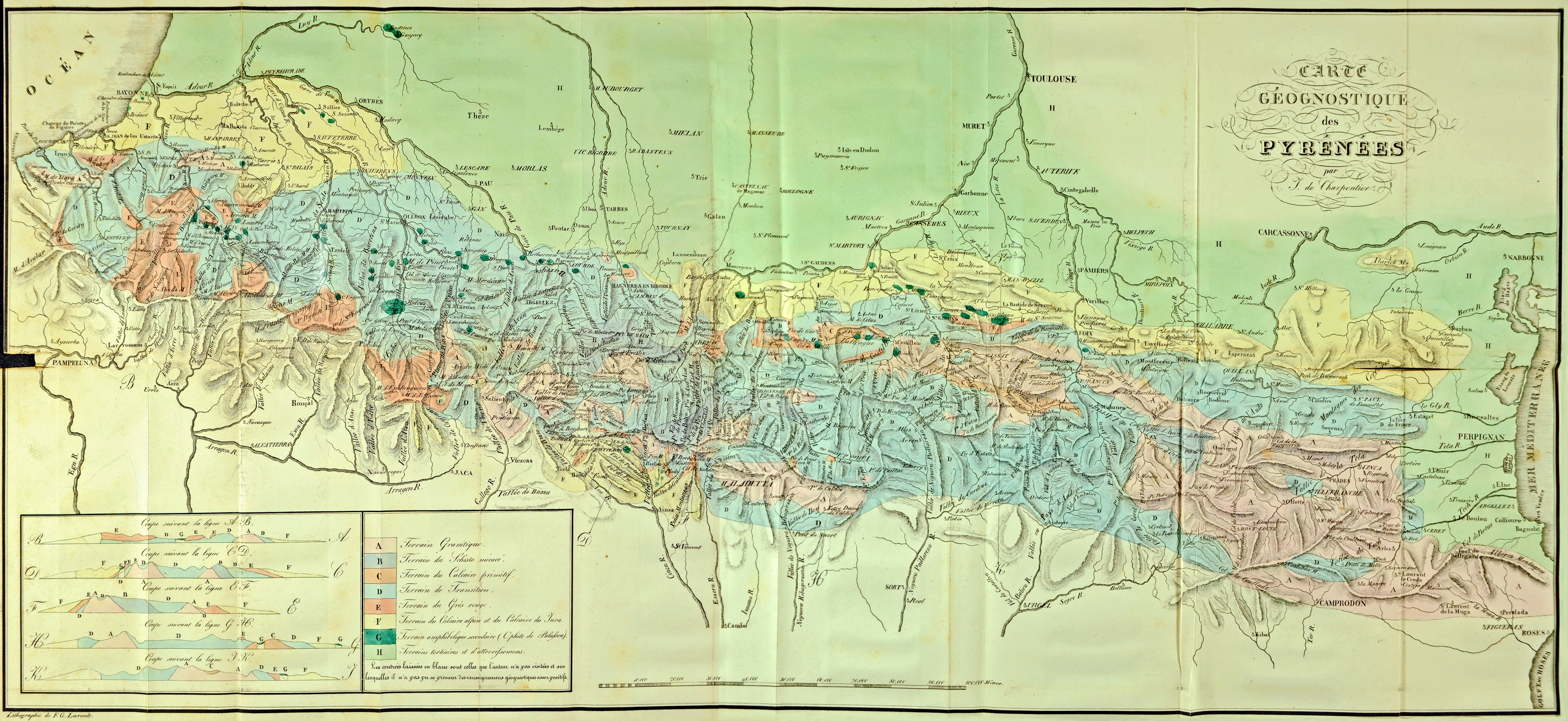
Carte Géologique des Pyrénées

== Legacy ==
The glacier of Charpentierbreen in Nathorst Land at Spitsbergen, Svalbard is named after him.

== See also ==
- Ice age

== Bibliography ==
- Tobias Krüger, "Auf dem Weg zu einem neuen Verständnis der Klimageschichte: der Alpenraum und die Anfänge der Eiszeitforschung" Blätter aus der Walliser Geschichte (Geschichtsforschender Verein Oberwallis), XLI, Brig 2009, pp. 123–160.
- Tobias Krüger, "Discovering the ice ages : international reception and consequences for a historical understanding of climate", in History of science and medicine library; vol. 37, Leiden 2013, ISBN 978-90-04-24169-5 (cloth); ISBN 978-90-04-24170-1 (electronic bk.) (pp. 148–154, 162–163, 167–168, 177–178, 186–188).
- Tobias Krüger, "À l'aube de l'âge de glace. Jean de Charpentier pionnier tragique d'une révolution scientifique", in Patrick Kupper, C. Bernhard Schär (ed.) Les Naturalistes. A la découverte de la Suisse et du monde (1800-2015), Baden, Hier und Jetzt 2015, ISBN 9783039193578, pp. 17–33.
