= Kjell Holler =

Norwegian economist and politician

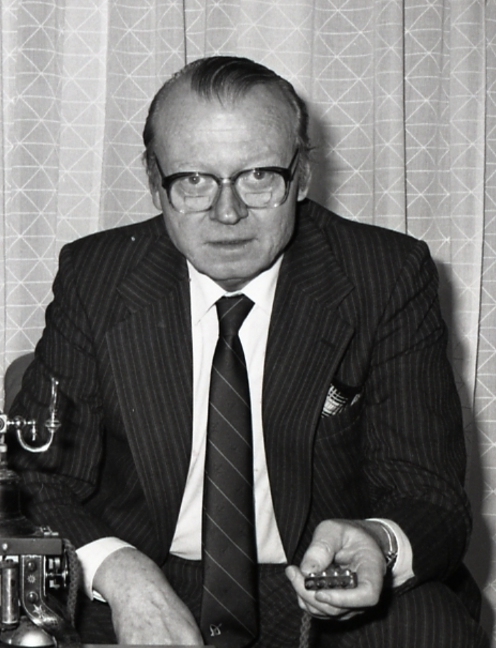
Kjell Holler (1986)

Kjell Torbjørn Holler (29 June 1925 – 1 November 2000) was a Norwegian economist and politician with the Norwegian Labour Party and a Minister of Industry.

== Biography ==
Holler was born at Tinn Municipality in Telemark, Norway. He graduated with a degree in economics at the University of Oslo in 1950. From 1950 to 1952 Holler was an employee at the daily newspaper Arbeiderbladet. He later handled media relations and community contact at the telecommunications company Televerket. Holler was chairman of Televerket from 1974 until he took over as director general 1980–1991. He served as chairman of the Norwegian Refugee Council from 1991 to 1997.

He was Minister of Industry in the cabinet of Prime Minister Einar Gerhardsen from 1959 to 1963. Holler was forced to resign as a result of the Kings Bay Affair.

The mountain of Hollertoppen in Heer Land at Spitsbergen, Svalbard, is named after Holler.

Business positions
Preceded by Per Øvregård	CEO of Televerket; 1980–1991	Succeeded by Tormod Hermansen
