= Frysja =

River of Spitsbergen, Norway

Coordinates: 77°44′06″N 15°24′36″E

Frysja ("the cold river") is a river in Nathorst Land at Spitsbergen, Svalbard. It originates from the glacier of Frysjabreen, flowing through the valley of Frysjadalen and outlets into Van Mijenfjorden. The headland of Frysjaodden is formed by gravel transported by Frysja.
