= Gustavdalen =

Valley of Spitsbergen, Norway

Coordinates: 77.8823°N 16.4061°E

Gustavdalen is a valley in Nordenskiöld Land at Spitsbergen, Svalbard. It has a length of about seven kilometers, and is located between Gustavfjellet and the mountain ridge Liljevalchfjellet, ending at Slettvika and Liljevalchneset at the northern side of Van Mijenfjorden. The valley is named after mineralogist Gustaf Nordenskiöld.
