= Alfred Elis Törnebohm =

Swedish geologist

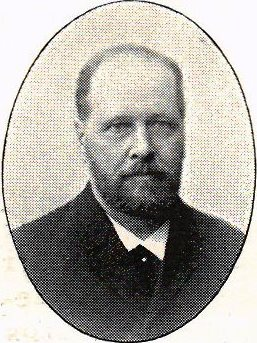
- Alfred Elis Törnebohm
- Born: 16 October 1838
- Died: 21 April 1911 (aged 72)
- Known for: overthrust of the Caledonian range
- Awards: Björkénska priset (1904)
- Scientific career
- Fields: Geology

Alfred Elis Törnebohm (16 October 1838 – 21 April 1911) was a Swedish geologist, best known today for his study of the overthrust of the Caledonian range.

After studies at the Royal Institute of Technology (KTH) 1855-1858, he worked at the Geological Survey of Sweden (SGU) 1859-1873, from 1870 as its head. 1873-1874 he studied petrographic microscopy at University of Leipzig under Ferdinand Zirkel. In 1874 he quit SGU for private activity as a geologist, and for a number of years he conducted geological surveys for various Swedish companies. He taught geology and mineralogy at KTH from 1878 and held a position as lecturer 1885-1897. He returned to SGU as head in 1897, succeeding Otto Torell, and was named professor. He remained on the post until 1906.

He was elected member of the Royal Swedish Academy of Sciences in 1876.

== Legacy ==
The mountain range of Törnbohmfjella in Nathorst Land at Spitsbergen, Svalbard is named after him.
