= Richterbreen =

Glacier in Svalbard, Norway

Coordinates: 77.644°N 15.525°E

Richterbreen is a glacier in Nathorst Land at Spitsbergen, Svalbard. It is named after the Austrian glaciologist Eduard Richter. The glacier has a length of about six kilometers and is situated between the mountain ranges of Törnbohmfjella and Kjellmanberget, flowing westwards from the ridge of Breskarvet down to the valley of Richterdalen. The river of Richterelva in Richterdalen originates from Richterbreen.
