= Frysjabreen =

Glacier in Svalbard, Norway

Coordinates: 77.671°N 15.556°E

Frysjabreen is a glacier in Nathorst Land at Spitsbergen, Svalbard. It has a length of about six kilometers, and extends from the ridges of Breskarvet and Kjellmanberget down to the valley of Frysjadalen. The glacier is named after the river Frysja, which originates from Frysjabreen and flows through Frysjadalen until its outlet into Van Mijenfjorden.
