= Rindersbukta =

Bay in Svalbard, Norway

Coordinates: 77.806°N 16.930°E

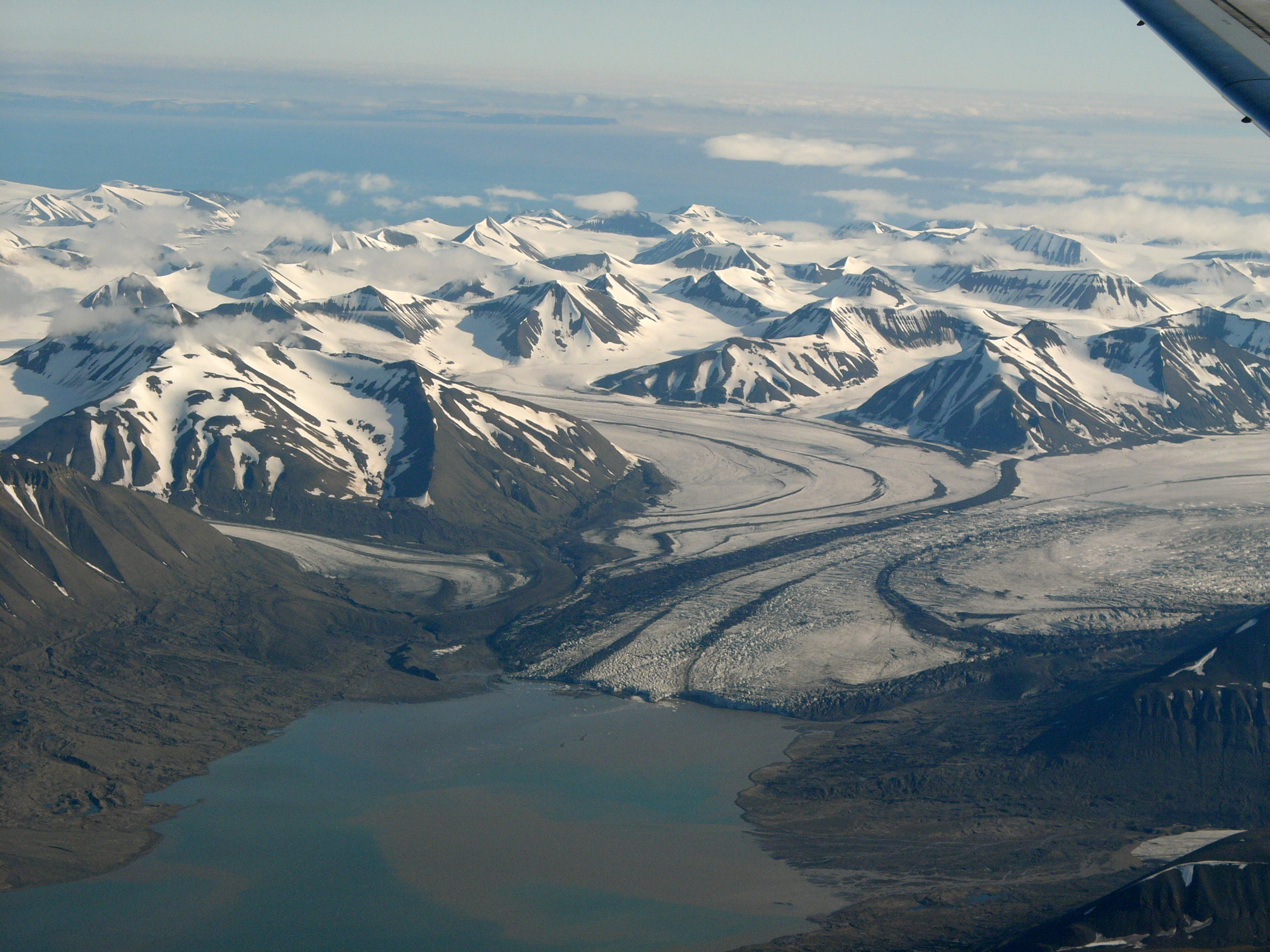

Rindersbukta is a bay in Nathorst Land and Heer Land at Spitsbergen, Svalbard. It forms the southern branch of Van Mijenfjorden. The glaciers of Scheelebreen and Paulabreen debouche into the bay. The bay is named after Dutch whaler Michiel Rinders.
