= Vriompeisen =

Mountain in Svalbard, Norway

Coordinates: 77.733°N 17.123°E

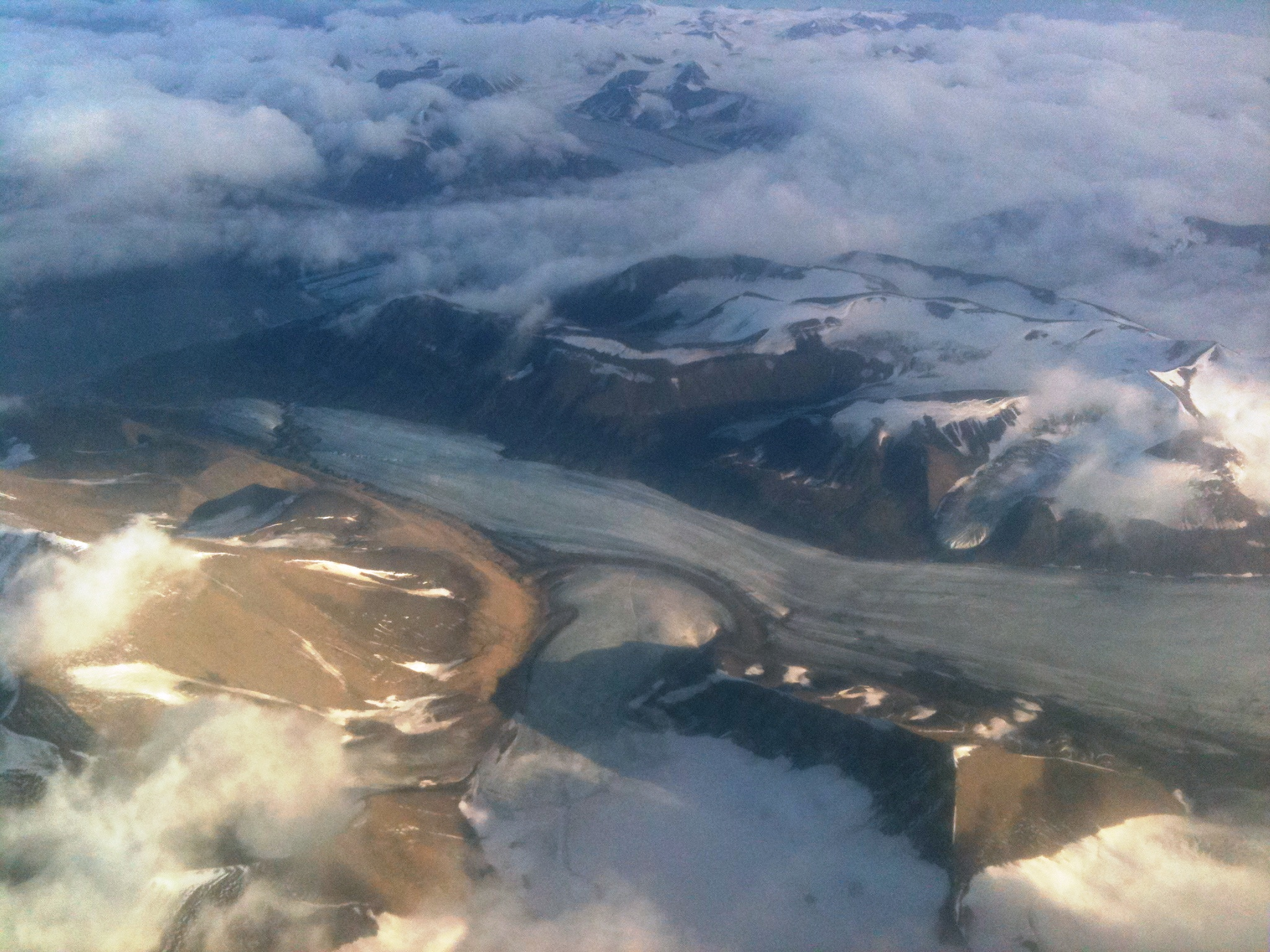
Vriompeisen in the background, behind Scheelebreen

Vriompeisen ("The Wronghead") is a mountain area in Nathorst Land at Spitsbergen, Svalbard. It comprises the peaks of Kroknosa, Peisen and Peisnosa, which form a U-shape surrounding the glacier of Peisbreen. Vriompeisen is located between the glaciers of Paulabreen, Scheelebreen, Klubbebreen and Sokkbreen.
