= Scheelebreen =

Glacier in Svalbard, Norway

Coordinates: 77.69°N 16.97°E

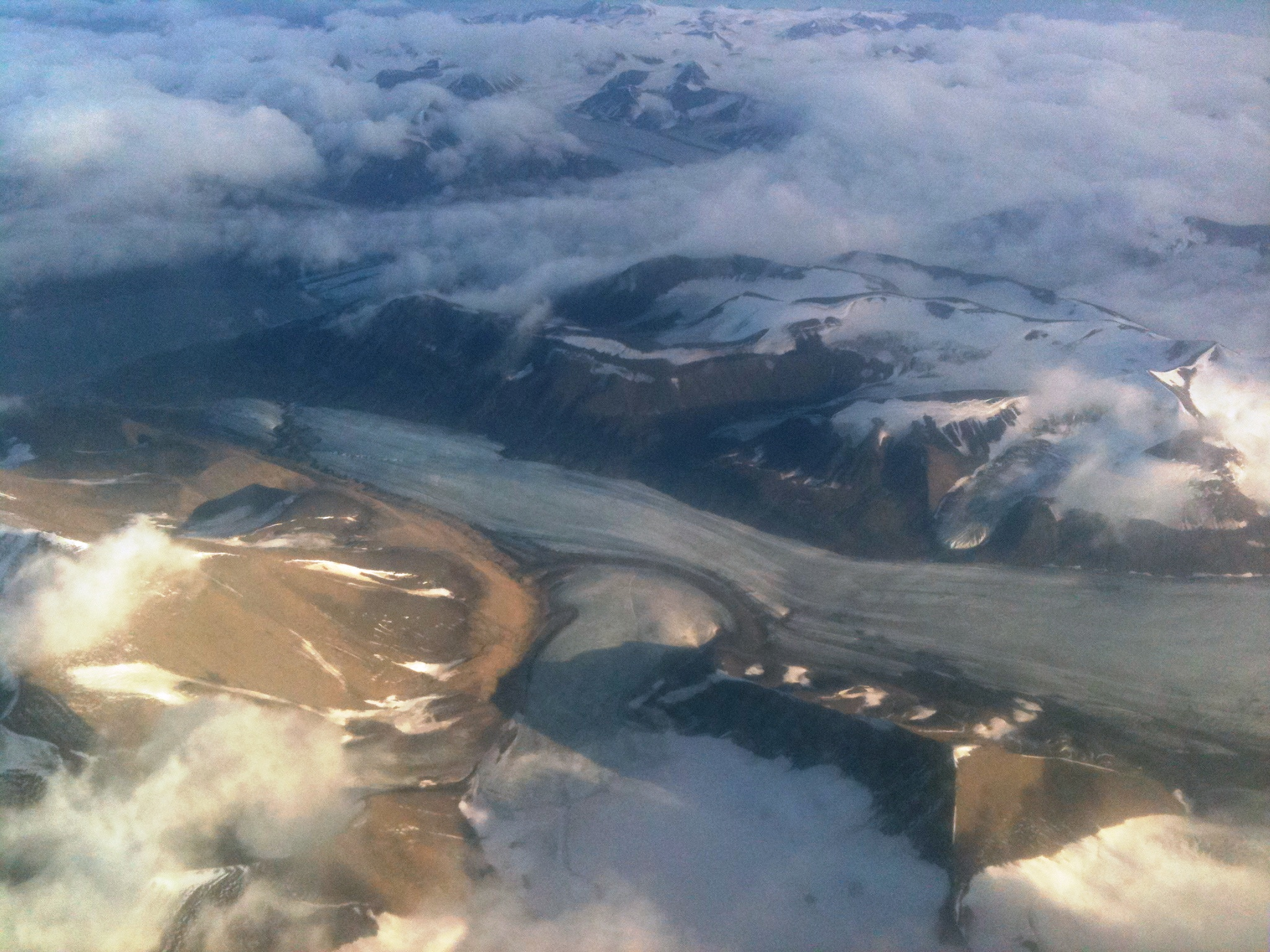
Scheelebreen

Scheelebreen is a glacier in Nathorst Land at Spitsbergen, Svalbard. It has a length of about sixteen kilometers, and is located between the mountains of Vriompeisen and Fagerstafjella. The glacier is named after Swedish chemist Carl Wilhelm Scheele.
