= Kjellströmdalen =

Valley of Spitsbergen, Norway

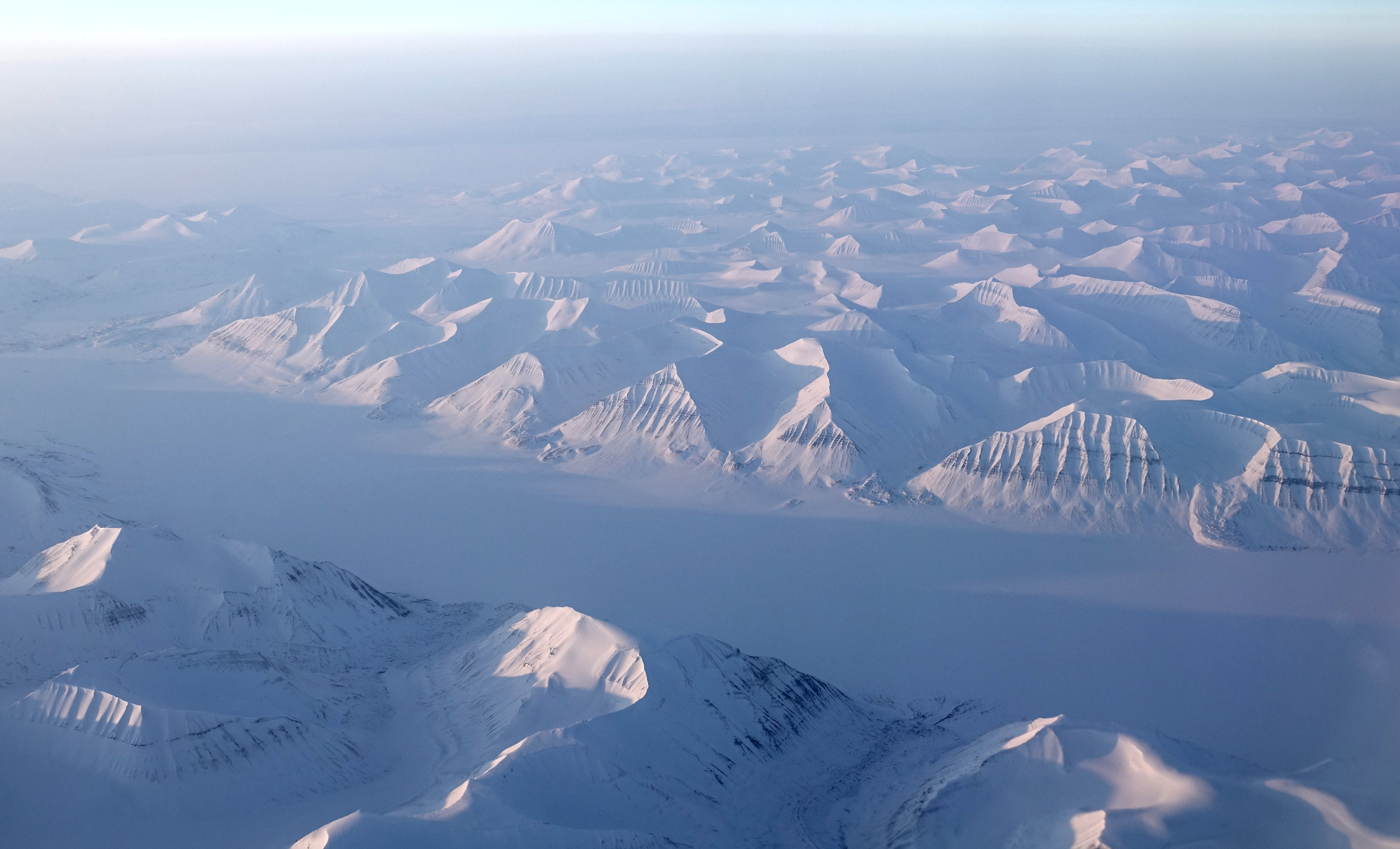
- The central section of Kjellströmdalen seen from the north from a plane.

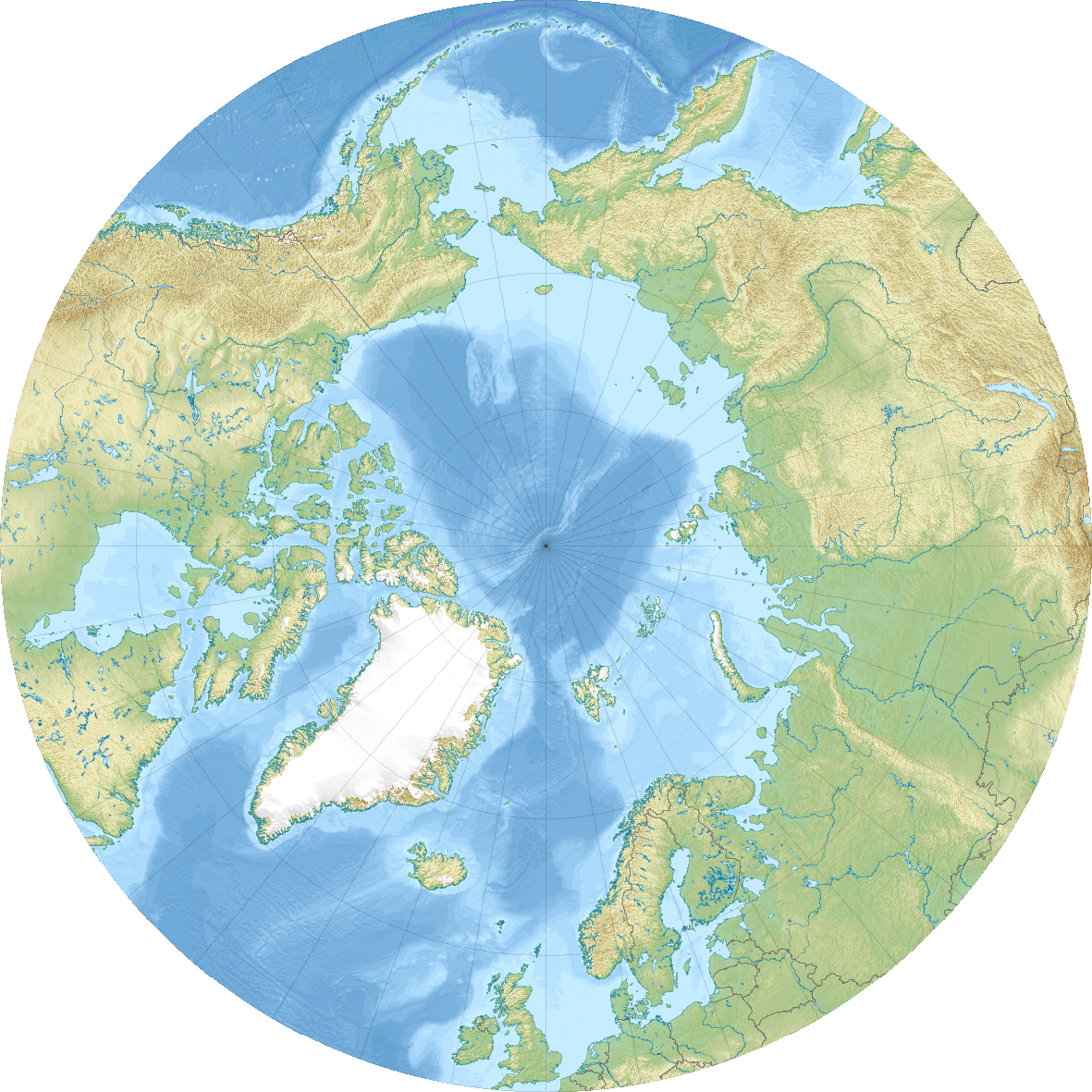
- Location within Svalbard Location within Arctic
- Length: 27 km (17 mi)

Geography
- Location: Spitsbergen, Svalbard, Norway
- Coordinates: 77°57′29″N 17°18′43″E
- Interactive map of Kjellströmdalen

Kjellströmdalen is a valley at Spitsbergen, Svalbard. It has a length of about 27 kilometers, and forms the border between Nordenskiöld Land, Heer Land and Sabine Land. The valley is named after topographer Carl Johan Otto Kjellström.

The valley debouches into Braganzavågen, a bay in the inner part of Van Mijenfjorden.
