= Eholmen =

Island in Svalbard, Norway

Coordinates: 77°36′N 14°55.5′E

Eholmen (English: Eider Duck Islet) is a 1.5 km long island in the divide between Bellsund and Van Keulenfjorden, on the west coast of Spitsbergen. It is the southwesternmost point of Nathorst Land.
