= Aspelin =

Aspelin is a surname. Notable people with this surname include:

- Arthur Aspelin (1868–1949), Finnish military officer
- Elias Aspelin (1721–1795), Swedish clergyman and botanist
- Gunnar Aspelin (1898–1977), Swedish professor of philosophy
- Gustaf Aspelin (1857–1917), Swedish-Norwegian mining engineer, entrepreneur, wholesaler and consul
- J.R. Aspelin (1842–1915), Finnish archaeologist
- Jonas Aspelin (1884–1964), Norwegian businessperson
- Marianne Aspelin (born 1966), Norwegian curler
- Simon Aspelin (born 1974), Swedish tennis player
- Tobias Aspelin (born 1968), Swedish actor
- Waldemar Aspelin (1854–1923), Finnish architect
