= Liljevalchfjellet =

Mountain in Svalbard

Coordinates: 77.9020°N 16.5903°E

Liljevalchfjellet is a mountain ridge in Nordenskiöld Land at Spitsbergen, Svalbard. It has a length of about 10.5 kilometres, and the highest point is 943 m.a.s.l. The ridge is located between the bay Braganzavågen and the valley Gustavdalen. It is named after businessperson Carl Fredrik Liljevalch. The mining settlement Sveagruva is located at the plain between Braganzavågen and Liljevalchfjellet.
