= Martinbreen =

Glacier at Spitsbergen, Norway

Coordinates: 77.646°N 15.670°E

Martinbreen is a glacier in Nathorst Land at Spitsbergen, Svalbard. It is named after Swedish botanist Anton Rolandsson Martin. The glacier has a length of about five kilometers. It is located between the ridges of Mjellegga and Breskarvet, and debouches into the valley of Davisdalen.
