= Braganzavågen =

Bay in Van Mijenfjorden, Norway

Coordinates: 77.9003°N 16.8473°E

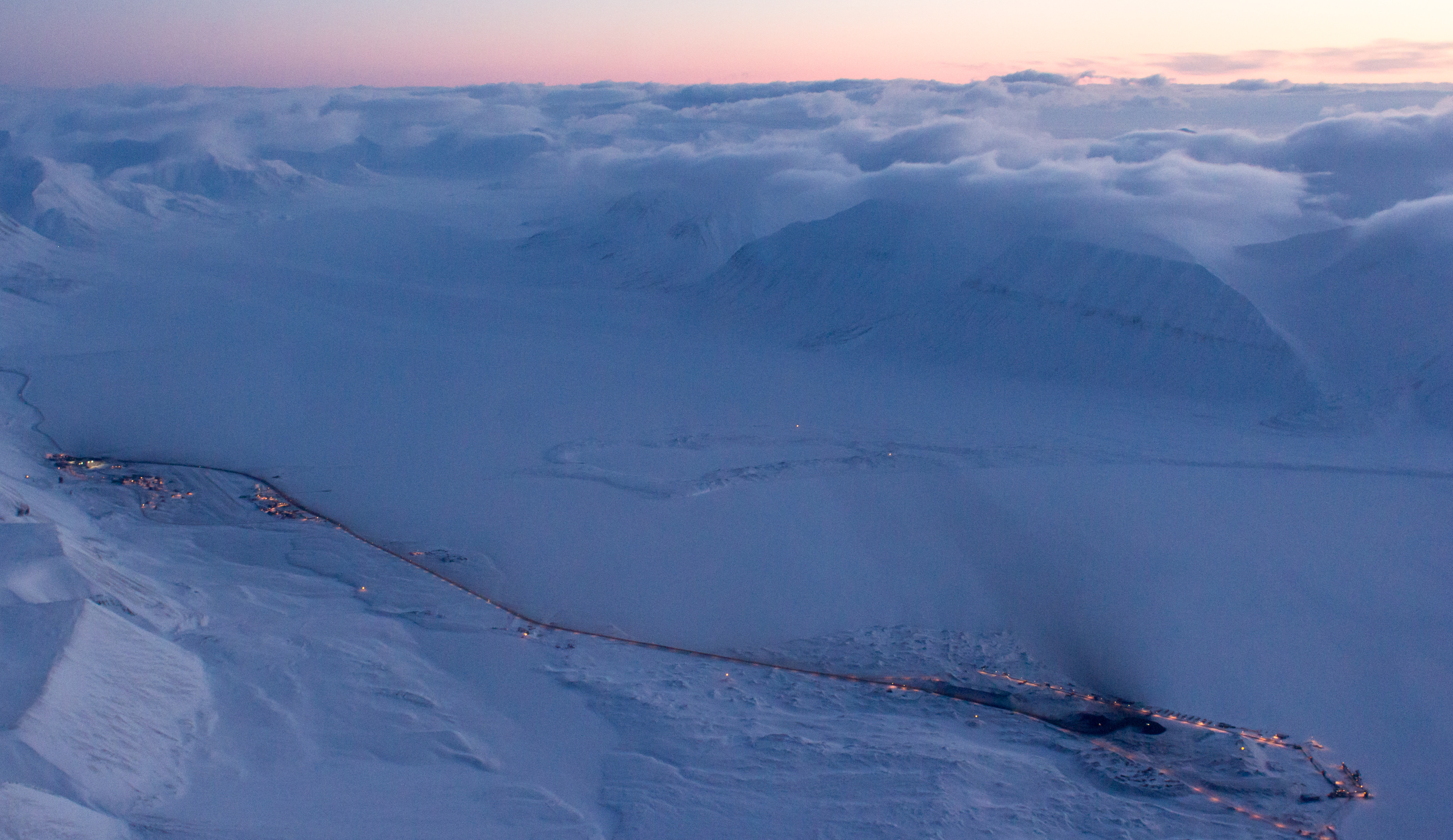
An aerial view of Svea and the surrounding snowy landscape of Braganzavågen in Svalbard

Braganzavågen is a bay located in the inner northern branch of Van Mijenfjorden, at Spitsbergen, Svalbard, within Heer Land and Nordenskiöld Land. The valley Kjellströmdalen debouches into the bay. The mining settlement Sveagruva is located at the western side of Braganzavågen, below the mountain Liljevalchfjellet.
