= Davisdalen =

Valley of Spitsbergen, Norway

Coordinates: 77.60°N 15.71°E

Davisdalen is a valley in Nathorst Land at Spitsbergen, Svalbard. It is named after American geomorphologist William Morris Davis. The valley has a length of about 5.5 kilometers, extending from the mountain ridge of Mjellegga southwards down to Davisodden, at the northern side of Van Keulenfjorden. A tributary valley to Davisdalen is Wittrockdalen.
