= Carrol Cove =

Human settlement in Canada

- Unincorporated community
- Interactive map of Carrol Cove
- Country: Canada
- Province: Newfoundland and Labrador
- Time zone: UTC−3:30 (Newfoundland Standard Time)
  - Summer (DST): UTC−2:30 (Newfoundland Daylight Time)
- Area code: 709

Carrol Cove is a settlement in Newfoundland and Labrador.
