= Elias Aspelin =

Swedish clergyman and botanist

- Born: 7 September 1721; Fryele, Småland, Sweden
- Died: 20 October 1795 (aged 74); Långasjö, Småland, Sweden
- Occupations: Clergyman, botanist
- Known for: Flora Oeconomica (1748)
- Awards: Degree of Master of Philosophy Title of Provost
- Honours: Apostles of Linnaeus

Elias Aspelin (born 7 September 1721 – 20 October 1795 in Långasjö) was a Swedish clergyman and botanist, one of the disciples of Carl Linnaeus.

== Biography ==
Aspelin became a student at Uppsala University in 1741 and received his Master of Philosophy (filosofie magister) in 1752. He was ordained as a priest in 1754, became vicar (kyrkoherde) in Långasjö in 1772, and provost (prost) in 1783.

== Academic work ==
In 1748, Aspelin defended a dissertation titled Flora Oeconomica with Carl Linnaeus presiding, and he published a Swedish translation of the work the following year. Although Linnaeus usually wrote the theses his students defended, some scholars believe Aspelin wrote Flora Oeconomica himself. Either way, he was the one who translated it from Latin into Swedish.

The work serves as a practical guide to plants that could be useful in daily life, farming, rural crafts, and cooking. It intentionally omits medicinal uses and botanical descriptions, focusing on the everyday applications of plants native to Sweden. The species are listed in the same sequence as in Linnaeus's Flora Svecica.

== Family ==
Elias Aspelin was the son of Jonas Aspelin, who served as vicar of Fryele parish in the Diocese of Växjö. He was also the nephew of Eric Fröberg. Aspelin married Christina Rebecka Wickelgren.
