= Gustavfjellet =

Mountain in Svalbard, Norway

Coordinates: 77.9331°N 16.4512°E

Gustavfjellet is a mountain in Nordenskiöld Land at Spitsbergen, Svalbard. It reaches a height of 1,218 m.a.s.l. Nearby glaciers are Livbreen to the west, Ankerbreen to the north, and Sjaktbreen to the east. The mountain is named after mineralogist Gustaf Nordenskiöld.
