= Heer Land =

Land area on Spitsbergen, Svalbard, Norway

Coordinates: 77°47′00″N 17°53′10″E

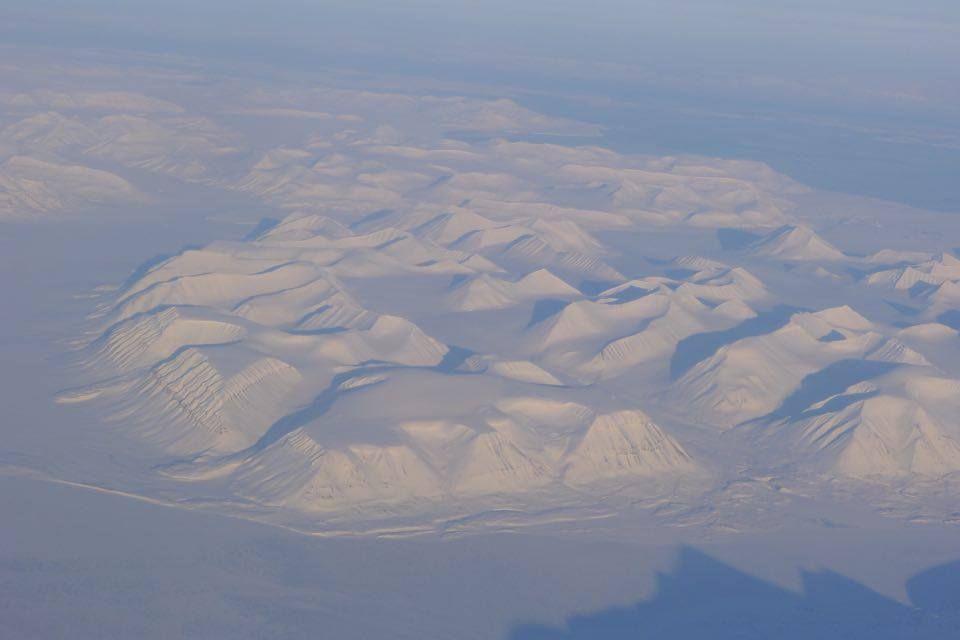
Heer Land as seen from the air in March 2016. Rindersbukta (front) is covered by sea ice.

Heer Land is a land area on the east coast of Spitsbergen, Svalbard. It is bordered by Rindersbukta to the southwest, Braganzavågen and Kjellströmdalen to the northwest, Storfjorden to the east and southeast, and Torell Land to the south. It is named after paleobotanist Oswald Heer. Heer Land mainly consist of glaciers and nunataks.

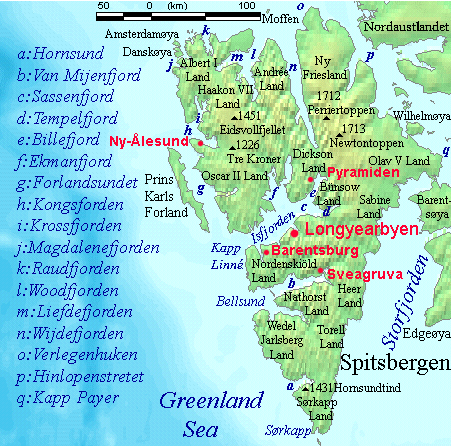
Heer Land is located on the eastern side of Spitsbergen.
