= Van Keulenfjorden =

Fjord on the west coast of Spitsbergen

Coordinates: 77°34′N 15°20′E

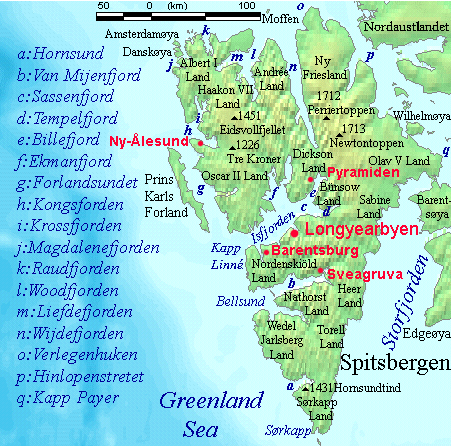
Van Keulenfjorden can be seen between Nathorst Land in the north and Wedel Jarlsberg in the south.

Van Keulenfjorden is a 30 km long fjord on the west coast of Spitsbergen separating Nathorst Land to the north and Wedel Jarlsberg Land to the south. Van Keulenfjorden is separated from Bellsund by Forsbladodden in the north and Richardodden to the south.

== History ==
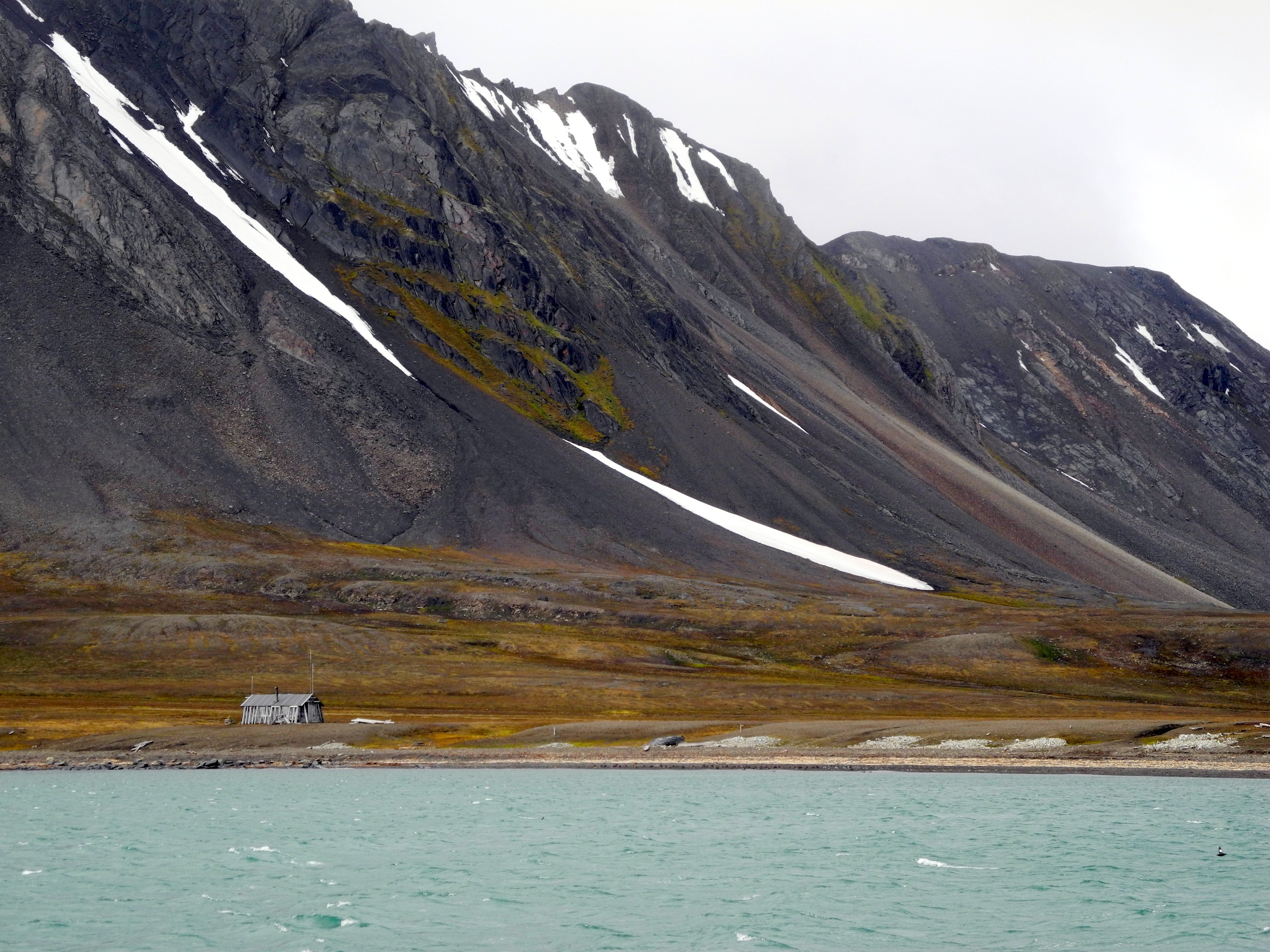
Whaling station at the Van Keulenfjorden

Whaling occurred here at least as early as 1613, when a little pinnace from St. Jean de Luz was said to have been behind Eders Island (at the mouth of Van Keulenfjorden). Van Keulenfjorden was originally called Sardam (Zaandam) Bay by the Dutch, and is labeled as such on maps from 1620 to 1710, when Cornelis Giles and Outger Rep (c. 1710) added the name Van Keulens baaytje to the anchorage behind Eders Island. The bay was named in honor of their publisher, Gerard van Keulen. William Scoresby (1820), thinking the name applied to the fjord as a whole, labeled it Van Keulens Bay. This mistake has been repeated by map-makers to the present day.
