= Nathorst Land =

Land area in Svalbard, Norway

Coordinates: 77°38′00″N 16°12′15″E

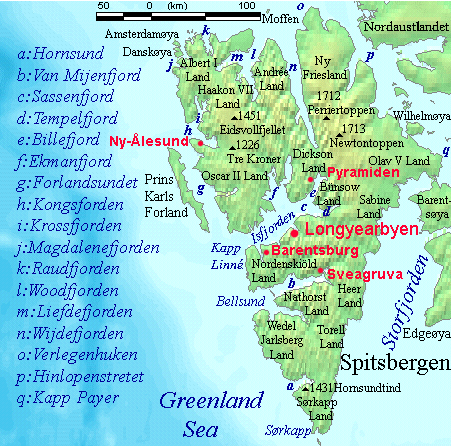
Nathorst Land is a peninsula located on Spitsbergen, between Van Keulenfjorden and Van Mijenfjorden.

Nathorst Land is the land area between the Van Keulenfjorden and Van Mijenfjorden fjords on Spitsbergen, Svalbard.

The area is named after Alfred Gabriel Nathorst.

The Aspelintoppen mountain is the highest peak in Nathorst Land.
