= Foldnutfonna =

Glacier in Svalbard, Norway

Coordinates: 77.3856°N 14.8041°E

Foldnutfonna is a glacier in Wedel Jarlsberg Land at Spitsbergen, Svalbard. It has an extension of about three kilometers, is a part of the Recherchebreen complex, and is located between Foldnutane, Haugknatten and Konglomeratfjellet.
