= Dolomittfjellet =

Mountain in Svalbard

Coordinates: 77.4305°N 14.9693°E

Dolomittfjellet is a mountain in Wedel Jarlsberg Land at Spitsbergen, Svalbard. It is located south of Martinfjella and Dolomittpasset, northwest of Skarvpasset. The mountain has two peaks, of 891 and 776 m.a.s.l., respectively. At the southwest side is the glacier Recherchebreen. Geologically, the mountain consists mainly of dolomite.
