= Gavltoppane =

Coordinates: 77.4491°N 14.9624°E

Gavltoppane (The Gable Summits) is a ridge with three peaks in Wedel Jarlsberg Land at Spitsbergen, Svalbard. They are located south in the Martinfjella mountain range, north of Dolomittpasset and Dolomittfjellet. The western peak is 888 m.a.s.l., the middle peak is 801, and the eastern peak is 718 m.a.s.l.
