= Kvartsittkammen =

Mountain ridge in Svalbard, Norway

Coordinates: 77.386°N 15.143°E

Kvartsittkammen is a mountain ridge in Wedel Jarlsberg Land at Spitsbergen, in Norway's Svalbard archipelago. The 8.5-kilometer-long ridge is a located between the Tverrbreen and Bjørnbreen glaciers.
