= Varderyggfonna =

Glacier in Svalbard, Norway

- Location within Svalbard
- Location: Wedel Jarlsberg Land; Spitsbergen, Svalbard
- Coordinates: 77°22′07″N 14°52′28″E
- Length: 3.5 km (2.2 mi)

Varderyggfonna is a glacier in Wedel Jarlsberg Land at Spitsbergen, Svalbard. The glacier has a length of about 3.5 kilometers, is part of the Recherchebreen glacier complex, and is located between Konglomeratfjellet, Haugknatten and Varderyggen.

== See also ==
- List of glaciers in Svalbard
