= Dunderdalsbreen =

Glacier in Svalbard, Norway

Coordinates: 77.3697°N 14.6952°E

Dunderdalsbreen is a glacier in Wedel Jarlsberg Land at Spitsbergen, Svalbard. It has a length of about four kilometers, and is located between Konglomeratfjellet and Lifjellet.
