= Ramondbreen =

Glacier in Svalbard, Norway

Coordinates: 77.4415°N 14.6890°E

Ramondbreen is a glacier in Wedel Jarlsberg Land at Spitsbergen, Svalbard. The glacier has a length of about two kilometers, and is part of the Recherchebreen glacier complex. It is named after Arctic explorer Gontaud Ramond.
