= Bienaimétoppane =

Mountain peaks in Spitsbergen, Norway

Coordinates: 77.4639°N 14.9070°E

Bienaimétoppane are two mountain peaks in Wedel Jarlsberg Land at Spitsbergen, Svalbard. They reach the heights of 767 and 763 m.a.s.l. and are located in the Martinfjella mountain range. The summits are named after French naval officer Amédée Pierre Leonard Bienaimé.
