= Maria Theresiatoppen =

Coordinates: 77.5185°N 14.8465°E

Maria Theresiatoppen is a mountain in Wedel Jarlsberg Land at Spitsbergen, Svalbard. The mountain has a height of 653 m.a.s.l., and is the northernmost summit in the Martinfjella mountain range. The mountain is named after princess Maria Theresia of the house of Bourbon-Parma.
