= Durochertoppen =

Mountain in Svalbard

Coordinates: 77.4788°N 14.8834°E

Durochertoppen is a mountain peak in Wedel Jarlsberg Land at Spitsbergen, Svalbard.

== Location ==
It has a height of 782 m.a.s.l. and is located in the Martinfjella mountain range. The summit is named after French geologist Joseph Marie Elisabeth Durocher.
