= Gothankammen =

Mountain ridge in Svalbard, Norway

Coordinates: 77.3544°N 15.1775°E

Gothankammen is a mountain ridge in Wedel Jarlsberg Land at Spitsbergen, Svalbard. It has a length of about eight kilometers, and is a located between the glaciers of Høgstebreen and Bjørnbreen. The ridge is named after German scientist Walther Gothan. The highest point of the ridge is 929 m.a.s.l.
