= Foldnutane =

Mountain in Spitsbergen, Norway

Coordinates: 77.3920°N 14.7498°E

Foldnutane is a mountain in Wedel Jarlsberg Land at Spitsbergen, Svalbard. It has a length of about 2.5 kilometers, with two peaks of 698 and 658 m.a.s.l. respectively, and is located between Dunderdalen and the Recherchebreen glacier complex.
