= Tverrbreen =

Glacier at Svalbard

Coordinates: 77.4092°N 15.1050°E

Tverrbreen is a glacier in Wedel Jarlsberg Land at Spitsbergen, Svalbard. It has a length of about seven kilometers, and is a tributary to Recherchebreen. It is part of the greater glacier system in the region of Svalbard. These glaciers are affected by regional climate patterns, like precipitation levels and temperature fluctuations leading to changes in ice volume and glacial morphology over time.
