= Bjørnbreen =

Glacier in Svalbard, Norway

Coordinates: 77.3721°N 15.1641°E

Bjørnbreen is a glacier in Wedel Jarlsberg Land at Spitsbergen, Svalbard. It has a length of about ten kilometers, and is a branch of Recherchebreen, located between the ridges of Kvartsittkammen and Gothankammen.
