= Dollfusbreen =

Glacier in Svalbard, Norway

Coordinates: 77.4249°N 14.7062°E

Dollfusbreen is a glacier in Wedel Jarlsberg Land at Spitsbergen, Svalbard. The glacier has a length of about 1.5 kilometers, is part of the Recherchebreen glacier complex, and is located between Steinegga and Gaimardtoppen. It is named after Arctic explorer Gustav F. Dollfus.
