= Horten (town) =

Town in Vestfold, Norway

- Town/City
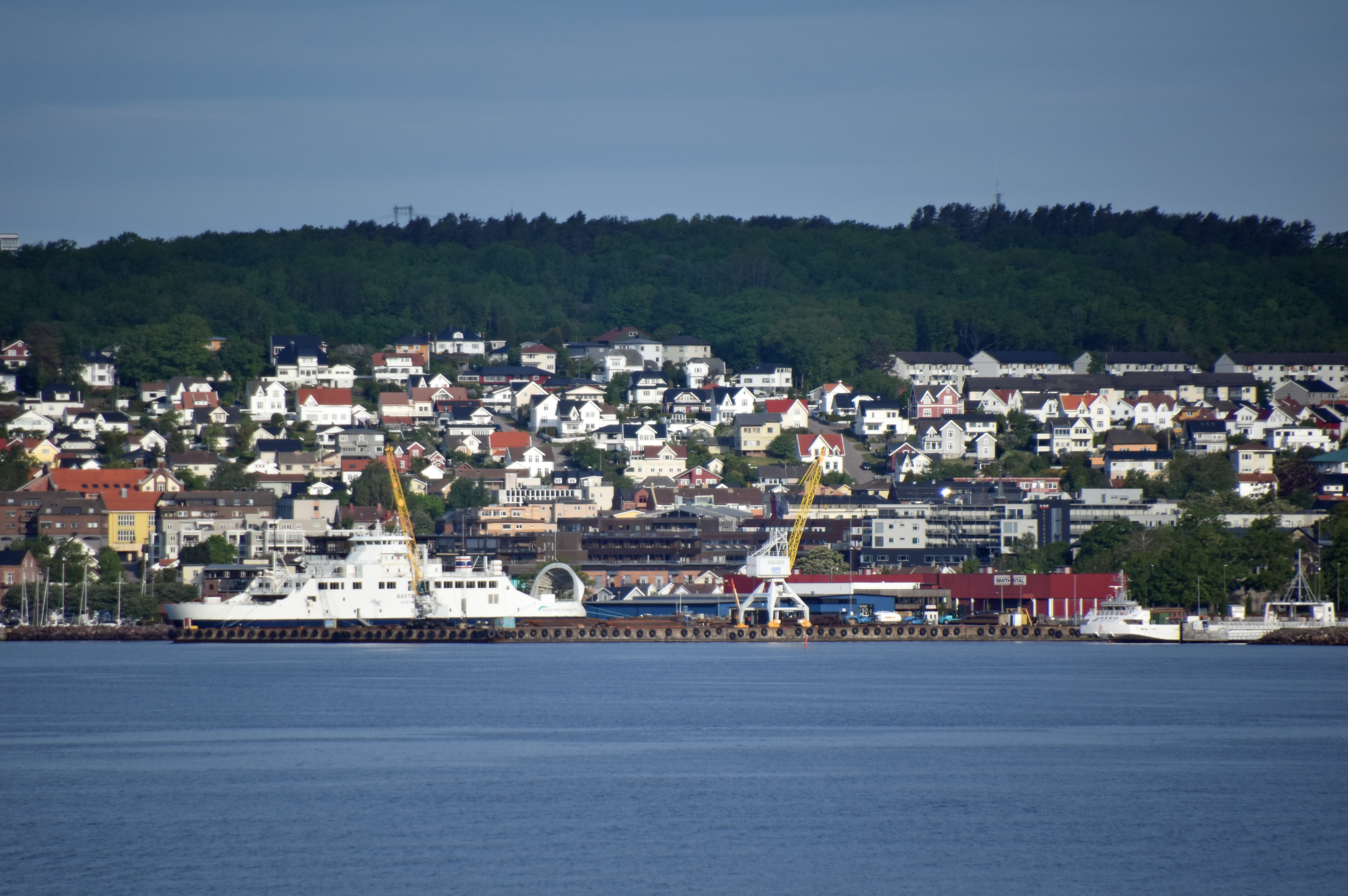
- View of the coastline of the town
- Nickname: Marinebyen (lit. 'Town of the Marines')
- Interactive map of Horten
- Coordinates: 59.41721°N 10.48344°E
- Country: Norway
- Region: Eastern Norway
- County: Vestfold
- District: Jarlsberg
- Municipality: Horten Municipality
- Established as
- Ladested: 1858
- Kjøpstad: 1907

Area
  - Total: 8.67 km^{2} (3.35 sq mi)
- Elevation: 10 m (33 ft)

Population (2026)
  - Total: 21,288
  - Density: 2,455/km^{2} (6,360/sq mi)
- Demonym: Hortenser
- Time zone: UTC+01:00 (CET)
  - Summer (DST): UTC+02:00 (CEST)
- Post Code: 3183 Horten

Horten (pronounced [ˈhɔʈn̩]; locally [ˈhɔʈːə]) is a town in Horten Municipality in Vestfold county, Norway. The town is located along the Ytre Oslofjord about 16 kilometres (9.9 mi) north of the town of Tønsberg and about 12 kilometres (7.5 mi) to the southeast of the town of Holmestrand. The town of Moss lies about 12 kilometres (7.5 mi) to the east, across the fjord.

The 8.67-square-kilometre (2,140-acre) town has a population (2026) of 21,288 and a population density of 2,455 inhabitants per square kilometre (6,360/sq mi).

== History ==
The development of the town of Horten is closely related to the Royal Norwegian Navy's activity in the area. By royal decree in 1818, Horten was designated as a military station similar to Fredriksvern (now called Stavern). The new naval harbor was to be built in the bay that is surrounded by a small peninsula and several islands. The navy's main shipyard was also built at Horten. In 1855, the entire naval facility was named Karljohansvern. Horten was designated as a ladested in 1857, which separated it from Borre Municipality and made it a self-governing urban municipality. In 1864, the naval school was transferred from Fredriksvern to Horten. In 1907, the small town was designated as a kjøpstad. The naval facility was located at Karljohansvern until 1940. During World War II, the Battle of Horten Harbour took place just offshore from the town of Horten. On 23 February 1945, the Nazi-occupied Karljohansvern base was bombed by British aircraft and the shipyard was completely destroyed. The base was rebuilt as a civilian state-owned company in 1948 (it closed in 1987). In 1960, the naval school was moved to Bergen. In 1963, the navy's main base was moved from Horten to Haakonsvern near Bergen. The naval officer's school was located in Horten until 2009, when it was also moved to Bergen. Now, there is the Royal Norwegian Navy Museum at Karljohansvern.

=== Name ===
The town is named after the old Horten farm (spelled "Hortan" in 1552) since the town was built on the old farm site. The name has an uncertain meaning. The name may come from a local dialect word hort which means the "outer, knotty bark on older trees" which likely derives from the Old Norse word hǫrtr which means "something uneven" or "wrinkled". Another option could be that it is derived from the Old Norse word hǫlkn or helkn which means "rocky ground", "shelter", or "place of refuge". Yet another option is that it could be the definite form of hort which can mean "bulge" (Old Norse: hǫrti). Several hills and mountains in Norway have the name Horten or Horta and here it could be referring to the Brårudåsen hill lying in the middle of the town.

== Government ==
In Norway, municipalities are the unit of local government. This means that cities and towns are simply designations for urban areas, but under current Norwegian law, they have no actual government authority. The town of Horten lies within Horten Municipality and is therefore governed by the municipal council of Horten Municipality.

== Transportation ==
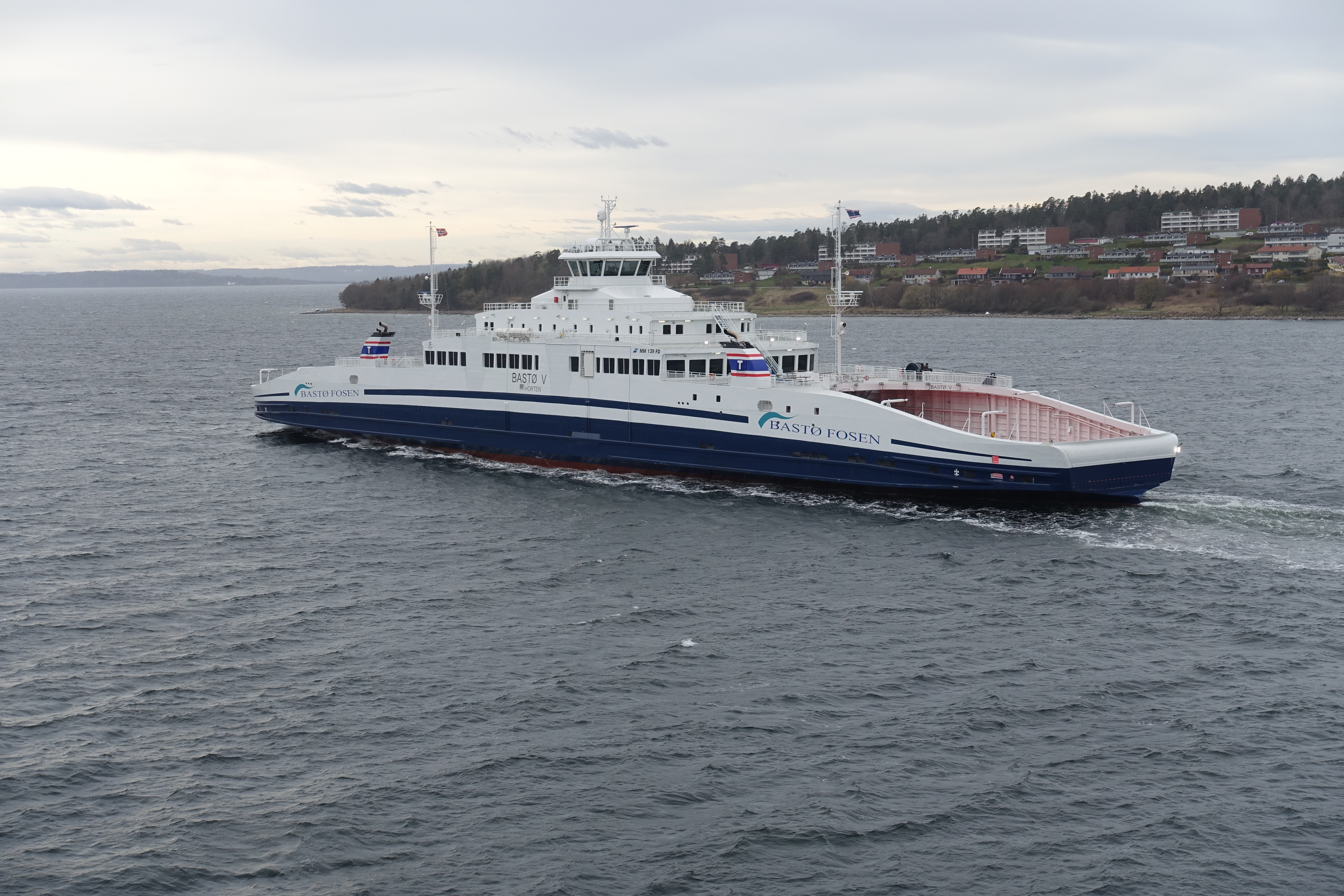
Ferries cut across the Oslo Fjord, connecting Horten and Moss.

Being located out on a peninsula, most major transportation arteries go to the west of Horten, and secondary roads connect the city to these routes. The Moss–Horten Ferry (also known as the Bastø Ferry) crosses the Oslofjord, connecting to the town of Moss in Østfold county. The ferry departs 1–4 times per hour, and the journey takes about 30 minutes. The ferry transports about 1.8 million vehicles and 3.5 million passengers each year.

The Vestfoldbanen railway line passes near the town of Horten, but not through the main town center. Skoppum Station is located southwest of the downtown, although several commuters prefer to use Holmestrand Station due to better road access.

== Media gallery ==
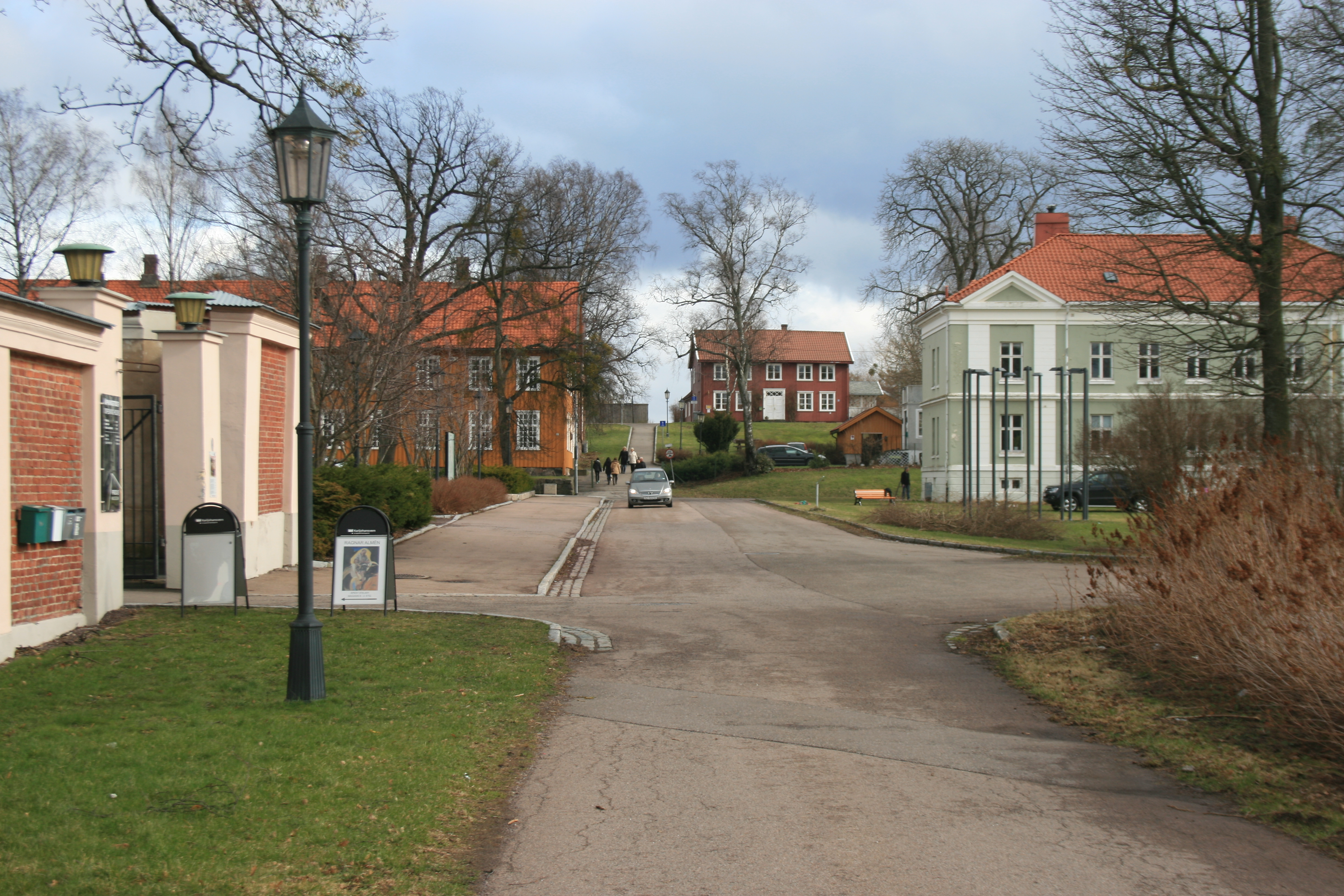

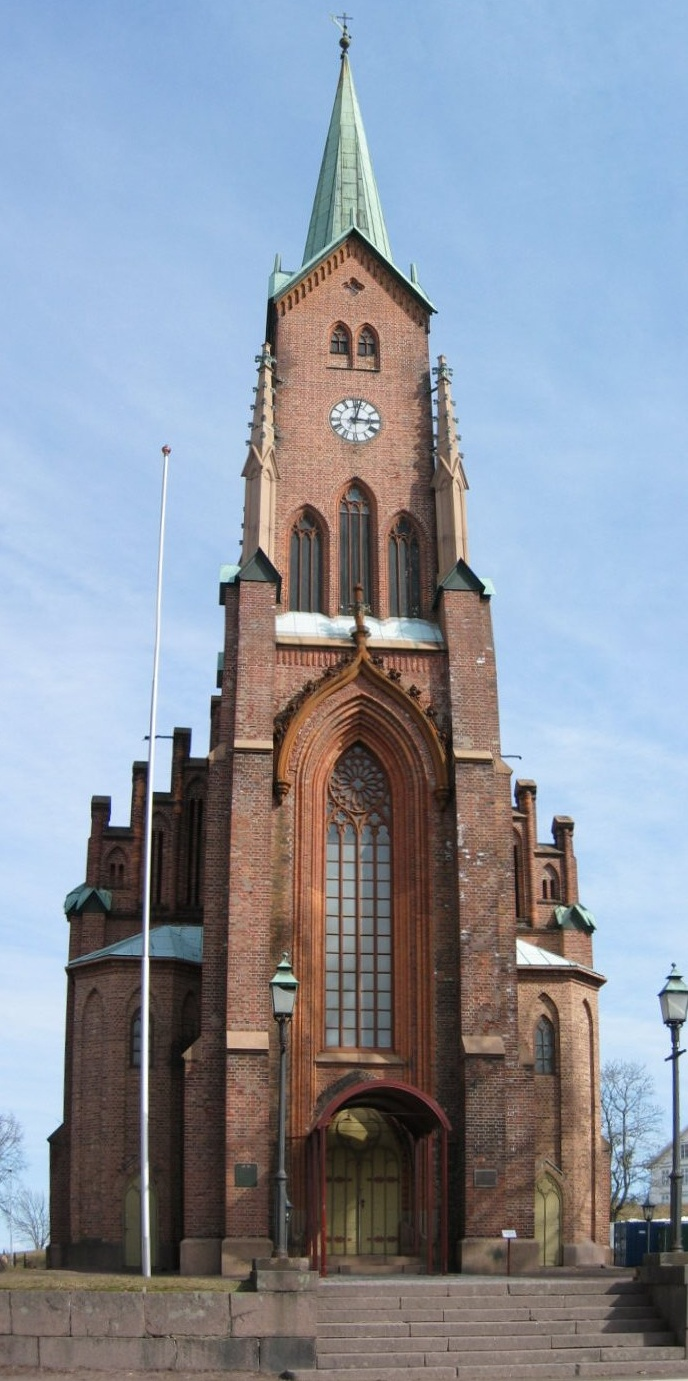

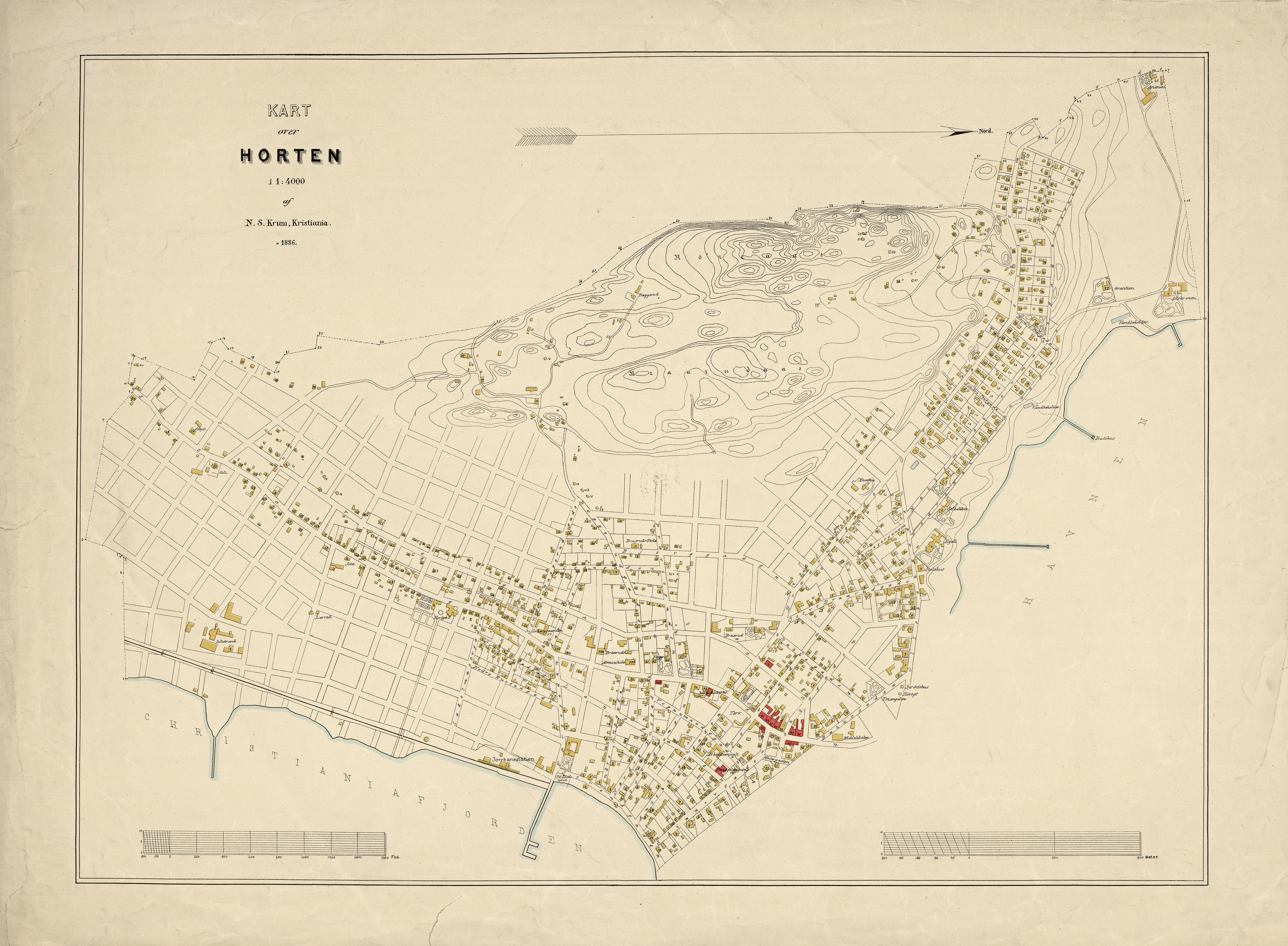

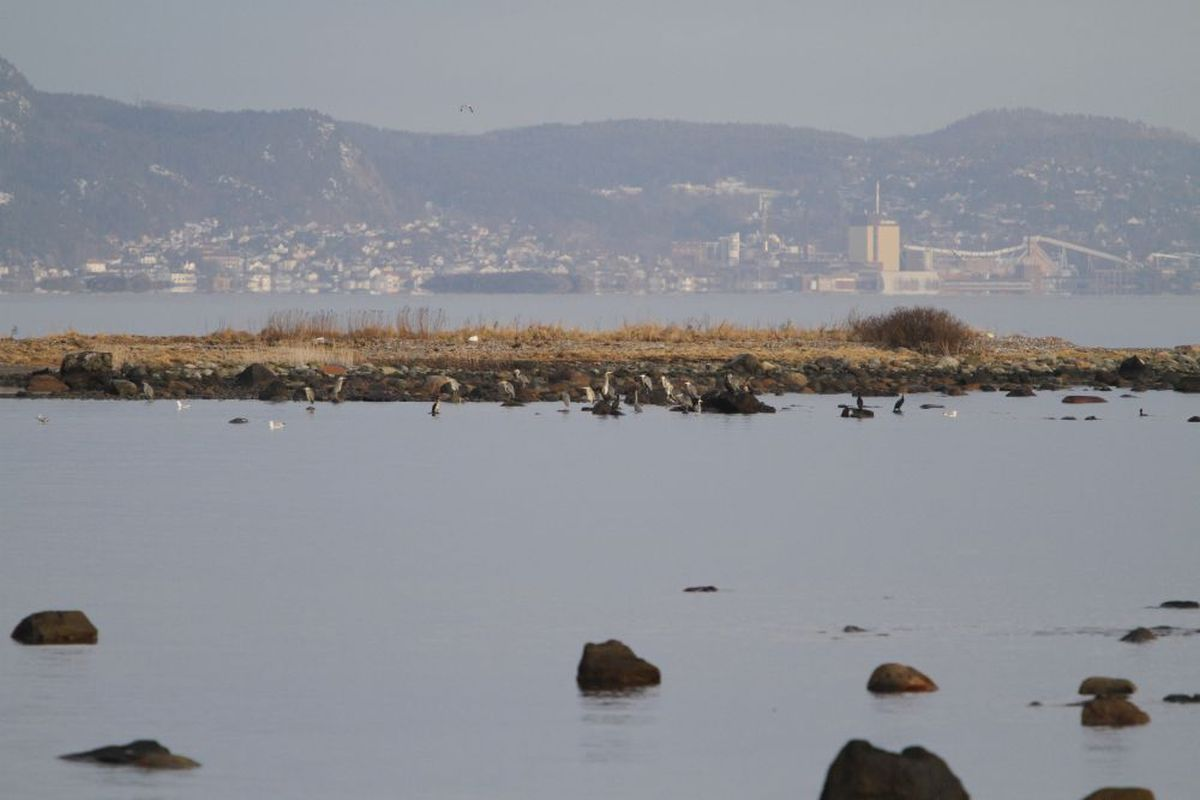

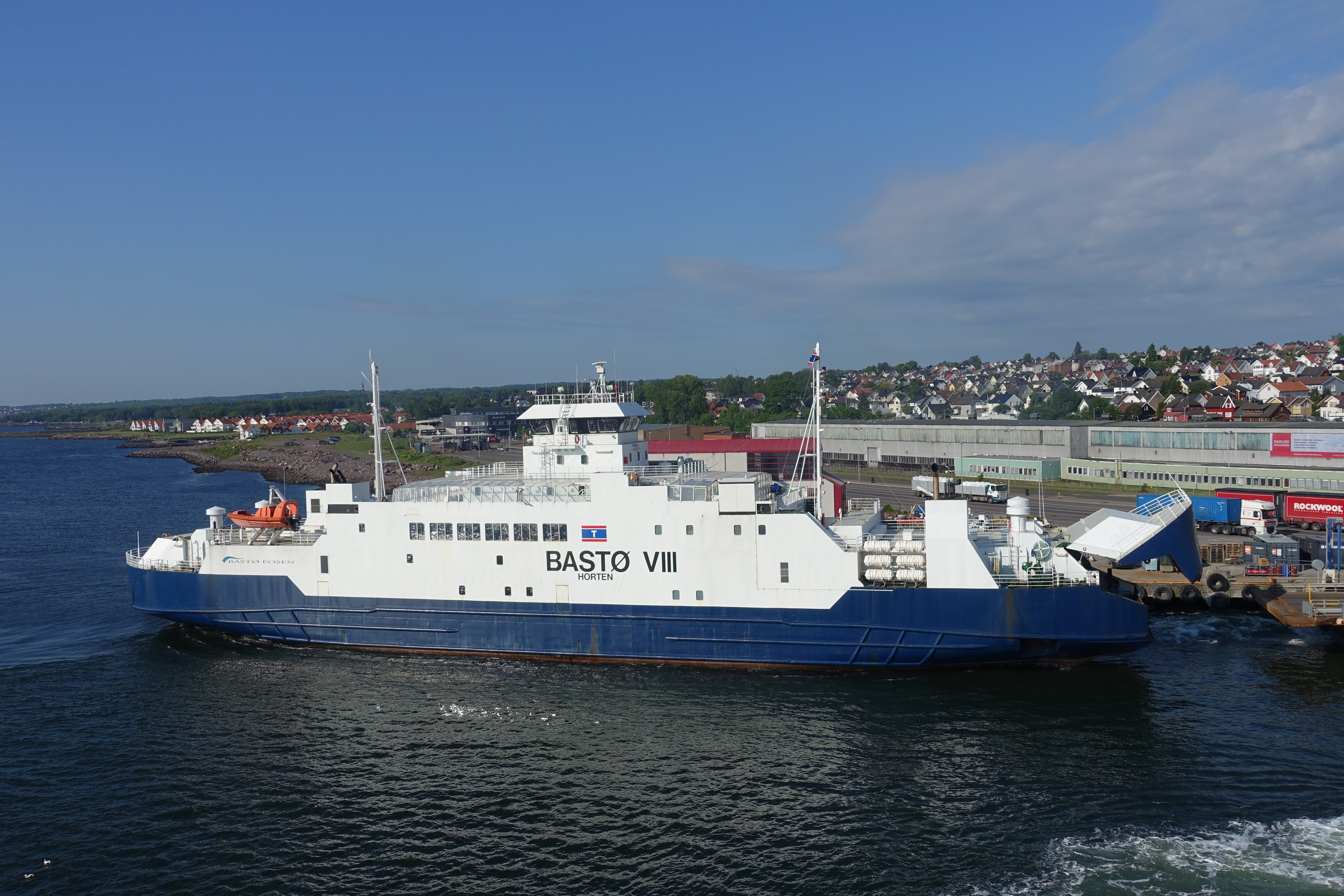

== See also ==
- List of towns and cities in Norway
