= Antoniabreen =

Glacier at Spitsbergen, Svalbard, Norway

Coordinates: 77.4700°N 14.9886°E

Antoniabreen is a glacier in Wedel Jarlsberg Land at Spitsbergen, Svalbard. The glacier has a length of about twelve kilometers and a width of two kilometers, and is located east of Martinfjella. The glacier is named after Maria Antonia of Parma.
