= List of settlements in Svalbard and Jan Mayen =

The archipelago of Svalbard and the island of Jan Mayen are Arctic possessions of Norway.

== Svalbard ==
=== Permanent settlements ===
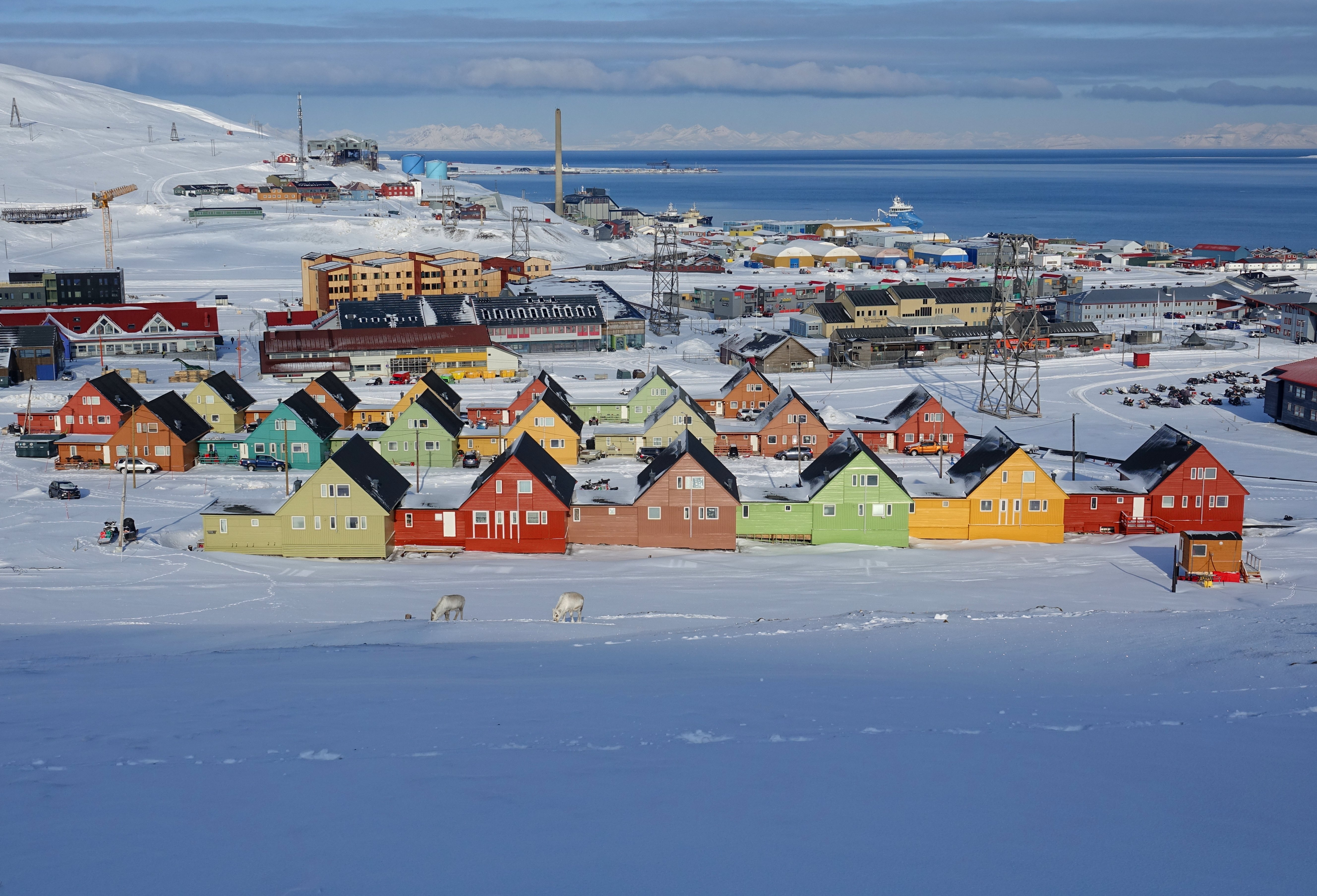
Longyearbyen in 2022

Over two thousand people live in Svalbard.

- Barentsburg, Spitsbergen
- Longyearbyen, Spitsbergen (administrative centre)
- Ny-Ålesund, Spitsbergen
- Nybyen, Spitsbergen

=== Staffed stations ===
- Bjørnøya radio, Bear Island (Bjørnøya)
- Hopen Radio, Hopen
- Isfjord Radio, Spitsbergen
- Polish Polar Station, Hornsund, Spitsbergen

== Jan Mayen ==
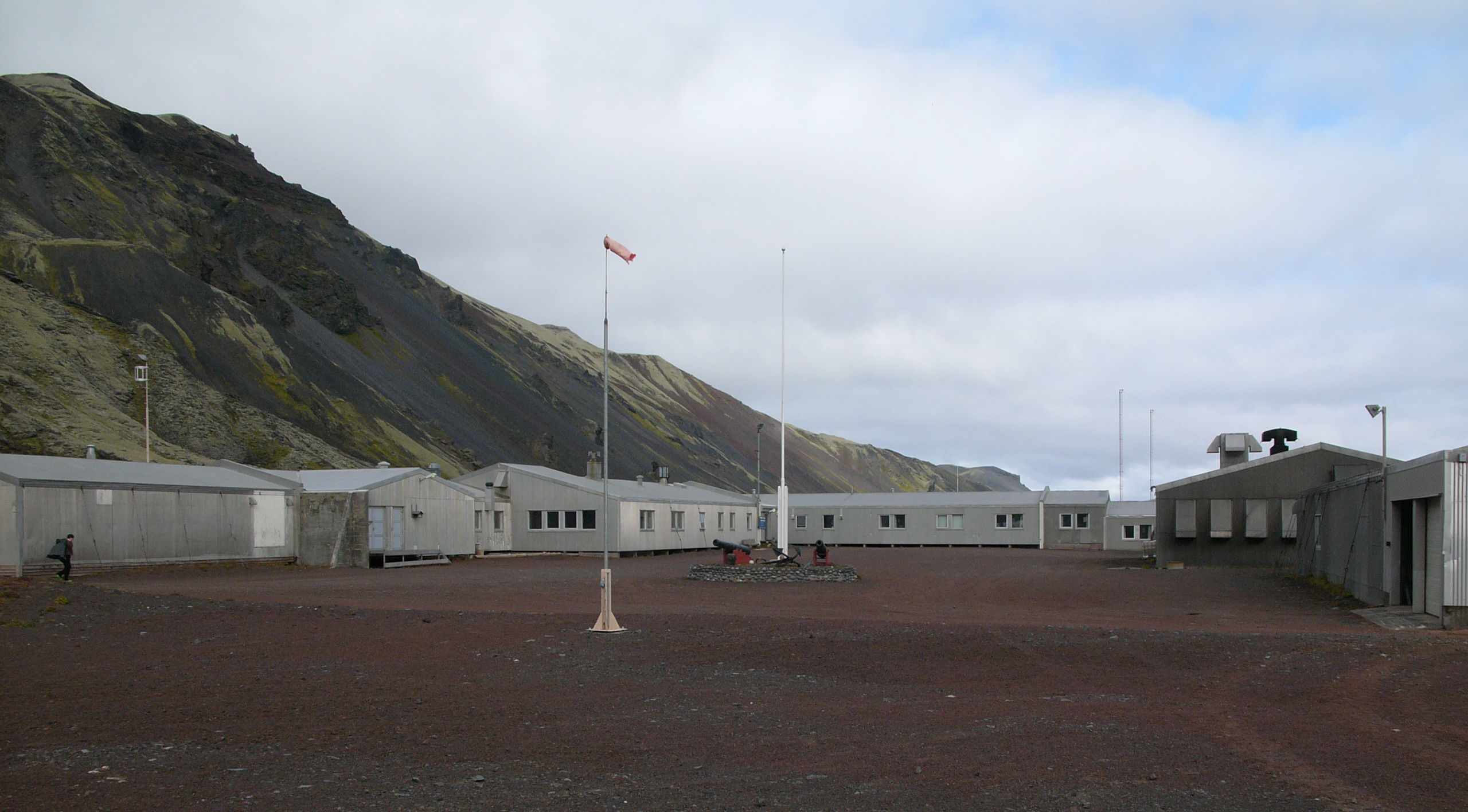
Olonkinbyen in 2007

Jan Mayen has no permanent population.

- Olonkinbyen (administrative centre)
- Puppebu (a cabin)
- Jan Mayensfield (an aerodrome)
- Frydenlund

== Former settlements in Svalbard ==
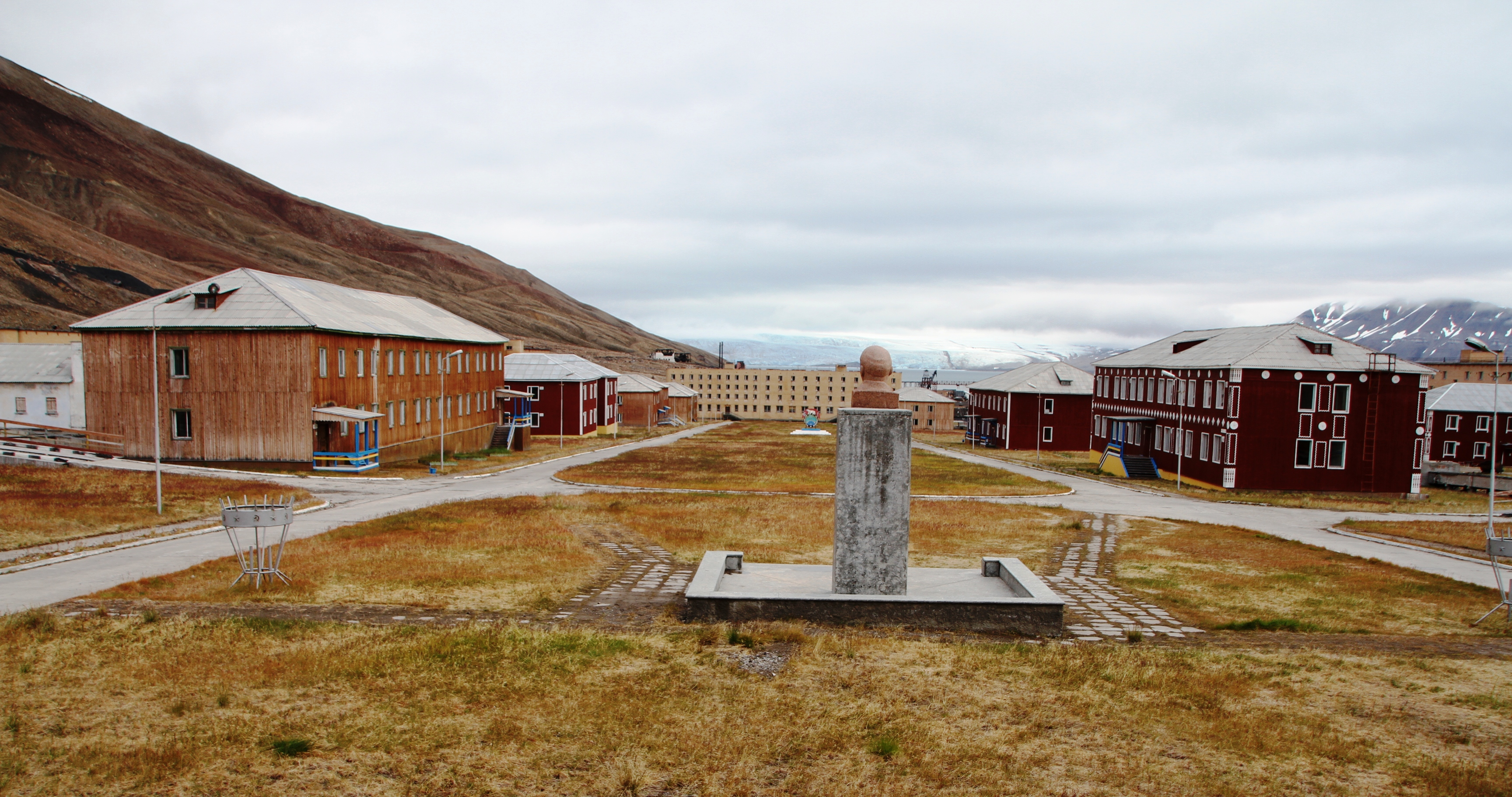
Pyramiden in 2012

- Advent City
- Bölscheøya
- Colesbukta
- Engelskbukta
- Finneset
- Gravneset
- Grumant (Soviet town, abandoned in the 1960s)
- Gåshamna
- Harlingen kokerij
- Haudegen
- Hiorthhamn
- Isfjord Radio
- Kinnvika station
- Kobbefjorden
- Lægerneset
- Ny-London
- Port Louis
- Pyramiden (Soviet/Russian town, abandoned in 1998)
- Smeerenburg
- Sveagruva
- Ytre Norskøya

== See also ==
- List of towns and cities in Norway
- List of research stations in the Arctic
