= Observatoriefjellet =

Mountain in Svalbard, Norway

Coordinates: 77.4812°N 14.6316°E

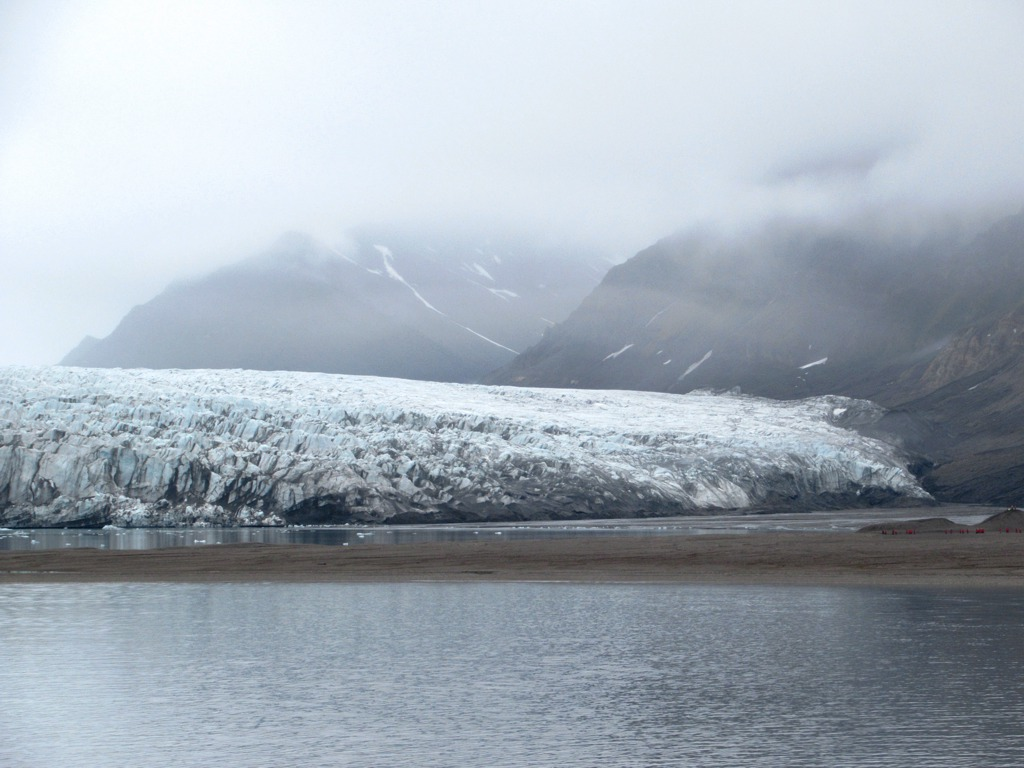
A glacier by the mountain.

Observatoriefjellet is a mountain in Wedel Jarlsberg Land at Spitsbergen, Svalbard. It reaches an elevation of 576 meters (1,890 ft), and is located at the inner end of Recherche Fjord, between the two bays Fagerbukta and Vestervågen.
