= Henry Potonié =

German archaeologist and botanist (1857–1913)

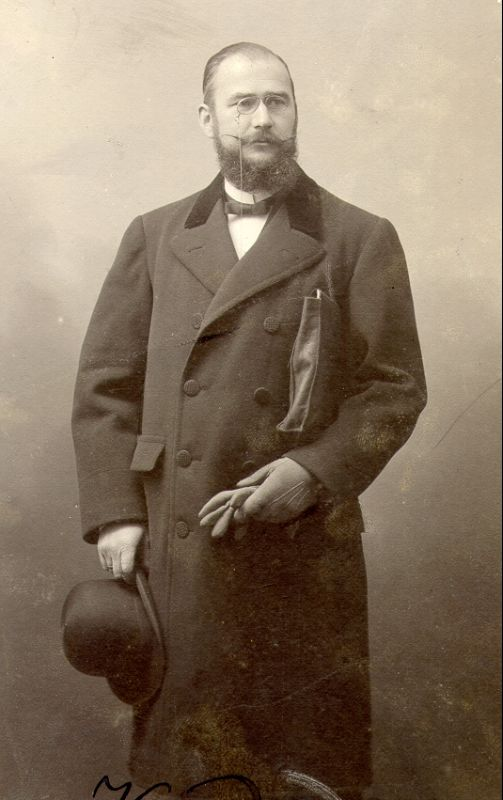
Henry Potonié (ca.1900)

Henry Potonié (16 November 1857 – 28 November 1913) was a German botanist and paleobotanist, known for his studies of coal formation.

Potonié was born in Berlin. He studied botany at the University of Berlin, and from 1880 served as a research assistant in the botanical garden at Berlin. In 1885 he became associated with the Prussian Geological Survey, and from that time, devoted most of his time to paleobotanical research. In 1891 he was appointed professor of paleobotany at the Mining Academy in Berlin, then around 1901, became a professor of paleobotany and geology at the university.

In 1888, he became editor of the Naturwissenschaftliche Wochenschrift, a periodical that he was associated with for 24 years, and supported several associations devoted to popularizing science in Berlin, such as the Urania.

He lived at Potsdamer Straße 35 in Groß-Lichterfelde (now a part of Berlin), where he died in 1913, aged 56.

== Selected works ==
In 1899 he published the highly acclaimed Lehrbuch der Pflanzenpalaeontologie (Textbook of Plant Paleontology); its second edition being published in 1921 by Walther Gothan with the title Lehrbuch der Paläobotanik. Potonié's other principal works include:

- Illustrierte Flora von Nord- und Mittel-Deutschland mit einer Einführung in die Botanik, 1885 – Illustrated flora of northern and central Germany, etc.
- Die Pflanzenwelt Norddeutschlands in den verschiedenen Zeitepochen, besonders seit der Eiszeit, 1886 – The plant life in northern Germany of different time periods, especially since the Ice Age.
- Die Entstehung der Steinkohle und verwandter Bildungen einschliesslich des Petroleums, 1905 – The genesis of hard coal and related formations, including petroleum.
- Grundlinien der Pflanzen-morphologie im Lichte der Palaeontologie, 1912 – Elements of plant morphology in the light of paleontology.
