= Martinfjella =

Mountain range in Spitsbergen, Norway

Coordinates: 77.4828°N 14.8634°E

Martinfjella Mountain

Martinfjella is a mountain range in Wedel Jarlsberg Land at Spitsbergen, Svalbard. The range has an extension of about ten kilometers, and is located between the glaciers Antoniabreen and Recherchebreen. Among the mountains are Maria Theresiatoppen, Jarnfjellet, Magnethøgda, Durochertoppen, Bienaimétoppane and Gavltoppane.
