= Konglomeratfjellet =

Mountain in Norway

- Location within Svalbard

Highest point
- Elevation: 798 m (2,618 ft)
- Coordinates: 77°22′25″N 14°44′41″E

Konglomeratfjellet is a mountain in Wedel Jarlsberg Land at Spitsbergen, Svalbard. It has a length of about three kilometers, with two summits, the highest peak of 798 m.a.s.l. It is located between Dunderdalen and the Recherchebreen glacier complex, at the northern side of Dunderdalsbreen. Geologically, the mountain consists of conglomerate, which has given its name. The mountain is also the type locality for the Konglomeratfjellet Formation.
