= Walther Gothan =

German paleobotanist (1879–1954)

Walther Ulrich Eduard Friedrich Gothan (26 August 1879 in Woldegk – 30 December 1954 in Berlin) was a German paleobotanist, known for his studies of Carboniferous flora.

He studied mining and geology at the mining academies in Clausthal and Berlin, and botany and chemistry at the University of Berlin. In 1905 he received his doctorate from the University of Jena with the thesis, Zur Anatomie lebender und fossiler gymnospermen Hölzer.

From 1903 onward, he worked as an assistant at the Prussian Geological Survey. He taught classes in paleobotany at the Mining Academy and at Technische Universität Berlin, where in 1926 he became an associate professor. During the following year, he received an honorary professorship at the University of Berlin. In 1938 he was named a departmental head at the Prussian Geological Survey, and after World War II, was associated with work done at the Academy of Sciences of the GDR. In 1951 he founded the Arbeitsstelle für Paläobotanik within the Academy.

The fossil genera of Gothania, Gothaniella and Gothanopteris commemorate his name, the latter genus being described by Gen-ichi Koidzumi in 1936. His name is also associated with the Gothankammen, a mountain ridge on Spitsbergen.

== Selected works ==
- Die fossilen Hölzer von König Karls Land, 1907 – The fossil woods of Kong Karls Land.
- Entwicklungsgeschichte der pflanzenwelt. Pflanzengeographie. Die pflanzenwelt der tropen (with Hubert Winkler, Robert Knud Friedrich Pilger, 1913) – Evolutionary history of the plant world / Plant geography / The plant world of the tropics.
- Lehrbuch der Paläobotanik (with Henry Potonié, 1921).
- Paläontologisches praktikum, (with Otto Seitz, 1920) – Practical paleontology.
- Geschichtliches über die Verwendung und die Entstehungstheorie der Kohlen (with Rudolf Daber, 1956) – History on the application and the formation theory of coal.
