= List of towns and cities in Norway =

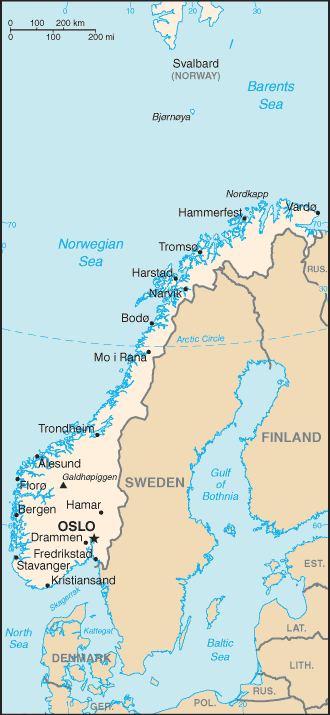
Map of Norway with important cities

This is a list of towns and cities in Norway. The Norwegian language word by means a town or city–there is no distinction between the two words as there is in English. Historically, the designation of town/city was granted by the king, but since 1996 that authority was given to the local municipal councils for each municipality in Norway. In Norway today, there are 108 towns/cities, but they have no legal authority or powers and they are not an administrative body, it is simply a designation. All local government rests with the municipality which may or may not have a town/city located within it.

== History ==
Historically, the words kjøpstad (market town), ladested (small seaport), or bergstad were used for a town or city. Each of these were granted certain special rights based on their classification and they did hold administrative authority within their borders. A ladested was subordinate to a kjøpstad and over time some of the ladesteds were "upgraded" to the status of kjøpstad in order to gain more trading rights. In 1665, Norway had 20 towns. There were 9 full market towns (kjøpstad): Bergen, Oslo, Trondheim, Tønsberg, Stavanger, Skien, Fredrikstad, Halden, and Kristiansand. There were two mountain towns {bergstad): Kongsberg and Røros. There were 9 market seaports (ladested): Larvik, Moss, Porsgrunn, Molde, Kragerø, Risør, Holmestrand, Mandal, and Drammen (which was actually 2 towns: Bragernes and Strømsø). All of the ladested places on this list were later upgraded to kjøpstads. During the 1800s, urbanization took hold in Norway and many new towns/cities were added. The special trading rights for towns/cities were abolished in 1857.

In 1946, Norwegian municipalities were each assigned a municipality number, a four-digit codes based on ISO 3166-2:NO. Towns/cities got a municipality number in which the third digit was a zero and rural municipalities were given other numbers. In 1952 the special classifications of for towns/cities (kjøpstad, bergstad, and ladested) were entirely rescinded from the law and replaced by the simple classification of by. Starting on 1 January 1965, the government's focus was moved from the individual towns/cities to their corresponding municipalities. All Norwegian towns/cities and rural municipalities were classified as either a bykommune (urban municipality) or herredskommune (rural municipality). This distinction was rescinded by The Local Government Act of 1992.

Between 1960 and 1965 many Norwegian municipalities were merged. For instance when the urban Brevik Municipality merged with both the urban Porsgrunn Municipality and the rural Eidanger Municipality, the new municipality was also called Porsgrunn Municipality and it kept the municipality number for Porsgrunn. As a result, Brevik was no longer considered an urban municipality/town. On another note, when the urban Hønefoss Municipality was merged with the rural Hole Municipality, Norderhov Municipality, Tyristrand Municipality, and Ådal Municipality to form the new Ringerike Municipality, Ringerike retained the old municipality number of Hønefoss Municipality meaning that it retained its town/city status. The same thing happened to Egersund and Florø.

Before 1996, the city status was awarded by the king and Government through the Ministry of Local Government and Regional Development. Since then, the status of town/city is decided by each municipal council and then it is formally accepted by the state. Since 1997, a municipality must have a minimum of 5,000 inhabitants in order to declare city status for one of its settlements. In 1999, the municipal council of Bardu Municipality declared city status for Setermoen, only to be rejected because the municipality fell short of the population limit. One exception is Honningsvåg in Nordkapp Municipality, where the municipality actually has less than 5,000 inhabitants but declared city status before the limit was implemented by law in 1997.

Because of the new laws in 1996-1997, Norway witnessed a rapid rise in the number of cities after that time. A number of relatively small settlements are now called by, such as Brekstad with 1,828 inhabitants and Kolvereid with 1,448 inhabitants. Among the cities of today which got this status before 1996, Tvedestrand with 1,983 inhabitants is the smallest. On another note, the laws of 1996 allowed some settlements which lost their city status in the 1960s to regain it.

Oslo, founded in the 11th century, is the largest city and also the capital of Norway. Oslo is the only city in Norway that is consolidated with its municipality and county, thus the city of Oslo, Oslo Municipality, and Oslo County are all one unified unit of government.

== Cities and towns in Norway ==
City	Municipality	County	Town status		
City	Municipality	County	Year	Type	Assigned by
Alta	Alta Municipality	Finnmark	2000	By	Kommunestyre
Arendal	Arendal Municipality	Agder	1610; 1723	Ladested; Kjøpstad	Christian IV; Frederik IV
Askim	Indre Østfold Municipality	Østfold	1996	By	Kommunestyre
Bardufoss	Målselv Municipality	Troms	2021	By	Kommunestyre
Bergen	Bergen Municipality	Vestland (Note: Bergen was a separate county until 1 January 1972.)	1070	Kjøpstad	Olav Kyrre
Bodø	Bodø Municipality	Nordland	1816	Kjøpstad	Karl II
Brekstad	Ørland Municipality	Trøndelag	2005	By	Kommunestyre
Brevik	Porsgrunn Municipality	Telemark	1845–1963; 2009	Kjøpstad; By	Oscar I Kommunestyre
Brumunddal	Ringsaker Municipality	Innlandet	2010	By	Kommunestyre
Bryne	Time Municipality	Rogaland	2001	By	Kommunestyre
Brønnøysund	Brønnøy Municipality	Nordland	1923–1963; 2000	Ladested; By	Haakon VII; Kommunestyre
Drammen	Drammen Municipality	Buskerud	1811	Kjøpstad	Frederik VI
Drøbak	Frogn Municipality	Akershus	1842–1961; 2006	Kjøpstad; By	Karl III Johan; Kommunestyre
Egersund	Eigersund Municipality	Rogaland	1798	Ladested	Christian VII
Elverum	Elverum Municipality	Innlandet	1996	By	Kommunestyre
Fagernes	Nord-Aurdal Municipality	Innlandet	2007	By	Kommunestyre
Farsund	Farsund Municipality	Agder	1795	Ladested	Christian VII
Fauske	Fauske Municipality	Nordland	1998	By	Kommunestyre
Finnsnes	Senja Municipality	Troms	2000	By	Kommunestyre
Flekkefjord	Flekkefjord Municipality	Agder	1842	Kjøpstad	Karl III Johan
Florø	Kinn Municipality	Vestland	1860	Ladested	Karl IV
Fosnavåg	Herøy Municipality	Møre og Romsdal	2000	By	Kommunestyre
Fredrikstad	Fredrikstad Municipality	Østfold	1567	Kjøpstad	Frederik II
Førde	Sunnfjord Municipality	Vestland	1997	By	Kommunestyre
Gjøvik	Gjøvik Municipality	Innlandet	1861	Kjøpstad	Karl IV
Grimstad	Grimstad Municipality	Agder	1622; 1816	Ladested; Kjøpstad	Christian VII; Karl II
Halden (Note: Previously known as "Fredrikshald")	Halden Municipality	Østfold	1665	Kjøpstad	Frederik III
Hamar	Hamar Municipality	Innlandet	c.1050–1587 1848	Kjøpstad; Kjøpstad	Harald Hardråde; Oscar I
Hammerfest	Hammerfest Municipality	Finnmark	1789	Kjøpstad	Christian VII
Harstad	Harstad Municipality	Troms	1904	Ladested	Oscar II
Haugesund	Haugesund Municipality	Rogaland	1854; 1866	Ladested; Kjøpstad	Oscar I Karl IV
Hokksund	Øvre Eiker Municipality	Buskerud	2002	By	Kommunestyre
Holmestrand	Holmestrand Municipality	Vestfold	1744; 1752	Ladested; Kjøpstad	Christian VI; Frederik V
Honningsvåg	Nordkapp Municipality	Finnmark	1996	By	Kommunestyre
Horten	Horten Municipality	Vestfold	1858; 1907	Ladested; Kjøpstad	Oscar I Haakon VII
Hønefoss	Ringerike Municipality	Buskerud	1852	Kjøpstad	Oscar I
Jessheim	Ullensaker Municipality	Akershus	2012	By	Kommunestyre
Jørpeland	Strand Municipality	Rogaland	1998	By	Kommunestyre
Kirkenes	Sør-Varanger Municipality	Finnmark	1998	By	Kommunestyre
Kolvereid	Nærøysund Municipality	Trøndelag	2002	By	Kommunestyre
Kongsberg	Kongsberg Municipality	Buskerud	1624; 1802	Bergstad; Kjøpstad	Christian IV; Christian VII
Kongsvinger	Kongsvinger Municipality	Innlandet	1854	Kjøpstad	Oscar I
Kopervik	Karmøy Municipality	Rogaland	1866–1964; 1996	Ladested; By	Karl IV; Kommunestyre
Kragerø	Kragerø Municipality	Telemark	1666	Kjøpstad	Frederik III
Kristiansand	Kristiansand Municipality	Agder	1641	Kjøpstad	Christian IV
Kristiansund	Kristiansund Municipality	Møre og Romsdal	1742	Kjøpstad	Christian VI
Langesund	Bamble Municipality	Telemark	1765–1963; 1997	Ladested; By	Frederik V Kommunestyre
Larvik	Larvik Municipality	Vestfold	1671	Kjøpstad	Christian V
Leirvik	Stord Municipality	Vestland	1997	By	Kommunestyre
Leknes	Vestvågøy Municipality	Nordland	2002	By	Kommunestyre
Levanger	Levanger Municipality	Trøndelag	1836–1961; 1997	Kjøpstad; By	Karl III Johan; Kommunestyre
Lillehammer	Lillehammer Municipality	Innlandet	1827	Kjøpstad	Karl III Johan
Lillesand	Lillesand Municipality	Agder	1821–1961; 1996	Ladested; By	Karl III Johan; Kommunestyre
Lillestrøm	Lillestrøm Municipality	Akershus	1997	By	Kommunestyre
Lyngdal	Lyngdal Municipality	Agder	2001	By	Kommunestyre
Mandal	Lindesnes Municipality	Agder	1921	Kjøpstad	Haakon VII
Mo i Rana	Rana Municipality	Nordland	1923–1963; 1997	Ladested; By	Haakon VII; Kommunestyre
Moelv	Ringsaker Municipality	Innlandet	2010	By	Kommunestyre
Molde	Molde Municipality	Møre og Romsdal	1742	Kjøpstad	Christian VI
Mosjøen	Vefsn Municipality	Nordland	1875–1961; 1998	Ladested; By	Oscar II; Kommunestyre
Moss	Moss Municipality	Østfold	1720	Kjøpstad	Frederik IV
Mysen	Indre Østfold Municipality	Østfold	1997	By	Kommunestyre
Måløy	Kinn Municipality	Vestland	2004	By	Kommunestyre
Namsos	Namsos Municipality	Trøndelag	1845	Ladested	Oscar I
Narvik	Narvik Municipality	Nordland	1902	Kjøpstad	Oscar II
Notodden	Notodden Municipality	Telemark	1913	Kjøpstad	Haakon VII
Odda	Ullensaker Municipality	Vestland	2004	By	Kommunestyre
Orkanger	Orkland Municipality	Trøndelag	2014	By	Kommunestyre
Oslo	Oslo Municipality	Oslo	1048	Kjøpstad	Harald Hardråde
Otta	Sel Municipality	Innlandet	2000	By	Kommunestyre
Porsgrunn	Porsgrunn Municipality	Telemark	1652; 1842	Ladested; Kjøpstad	Frederik III; Karl III Johan
Raufoss	Vestre Toten Municipality	Innlandet	2019	By	Kommunestyre
Risør	Risør Municipality	Agder	1630; 1723	Ladested; Kjøpstad	Christian IV; Frederik IV
Rjukan	Tinn Municipality	Telemark	1996	By	Kommunestyre
Røros (Note: Røros is technically not designated as a town/city. It has a special distinction as being a bergstad (mining town).)	Røros Municipality	Trøndelag	1646	Bergstad	Christian IV
Rørvik	Nærøysund Municipality	Trøndelag	2020	By	Kommunestyre
Sandefjord	Sandefjord Municipality	Vestfold	1845	Kjøpstad	Oscar I
Sandnes	Sandnes Municipality	Rogaland	1860	Ladested	Karl IV
Sandnessjøen	Alstahaug Municipality	Nordland	1999	By	Kommunestyre
Sandvika	Bærum Municipality	Akershus	2003	By	Kommunestyre
Sarpsborg	Sarpsborg Municipality	Østfold	1016	Kjøpstad	Olav II
Sauda	Sauda Municipality	Rogaland	1999	By	Kommunestyre
Ski	Nordre Follo Municipality	Akershus	2004	By	Kommunestyre
Skien	Skien Municipality	Telemark	1358	Kjøpstad	Hákon VI Magnússon
Skudeneshavn	Karmøy Municipality	Rogaland	1857–1964; 1996	Ladested; By	Oscar I Kommunestyre
Sortland	Sortland Municipality	Nordland	1997	By	Kommunestyre
Stathelle	Bamble Municipality	Telemark	1774–1963; 1997	Ladested; By	Christian VII; Kommunestyre
Stavanger	Stavanger Municipality	Rogaland	1125	Kjøpstad	Sigurd Jorsalfare
Stavern (Note: Previously known as "Fredriksvern")	Larvik Municipality	Vestfold	1943–1988; 1999	Kjøpstad; By	Haakon VII (Note: Stavern was designated a kjøpstad in 1943 under the Quisling regime. In 1946, after World War II, the Norwegian government formally approved this change effective in 1943.); Kommunestyre
Steinkjer	Steinkjer Municipality	Trøndelag	1857	Ladested	Oscar I
Stjørdalshalsen	Stjørdal Municipality	Trøndelag	1997	By	Kommunestyre
Stokmarknes	Hadsel Municipality	Nordland	2000	By	Kommunestyre
Svelvik	Drammen Municipality	Buskerud	1845	Ladested	Oscar I
Svolvær	Vågan Municipality	Nordland	1918–1964; 1996	Ladested; By	Haakon VII; Kommunestyre
Tromsø	Tromsø Municipality	Troms	1794	Kjøpstad	Christian VII
Trondheim	Trondheim Municipality	Trøndelag	997	Kjøpstad	Olav Tryggvason
Tvedestrand	Tvedestrand Municipality	Agder	1836–1960; 1997	Ladested; By	Karl III Johan; Kommunestyre
Tynset	Tynset Municipality	Innlandet	2020	By	Kommunestyre
Tønsberg	Tønsberg Municipality	Vestfold	c. 871	Kjøpstad	Unknown
Ulsteinvik	Ulstein Municipality	Møre og Romsdal	2000	By	Kommunestyre
Vadsø	Vadsø Municipality	Finnmark	1833	Kjøpstad	Karl III Johan
Vardø	Vardø Municipality	Finnmark	1789	Kjøpstad	Christian VII
Verdalsøra	Verdal Municipality	Trøndelag	1998	By	Kommunestyre
Vinstra	Nord-Fron Municipality	Innlandet	2013	By	Kommunestyre
Åkrehamn	Karmøy Municipality	Rogaland	2002	By	Kommunestyre
Ålesund	Ålesund Municipality	Møre og Romsdal	1823; 1848	Ladested; Kjøpstad	Karl III Johan; Oscar I
Åndalsnes	Rauma Municipality	Møre og Romsdal	1996	By	Kommunestyre
Åsgårdstrand	Horten Municipality	Vestfold	1650–1964; 2010	Ladested; By	Frederik III; Kommunestyre

== Former towns ==
City	Municipality	County	Town status			Reason for lost status
City	Municipality	County	Year	Type	Assigned by	Reason for lost status
Holmsbu	Hurum Municipality	Buskerud	1847–1964	Ladested	Oscar I	Municipal merger
Hvitsten	Vestby Municipality	Akershus	1837–1964	Ladested	Karl III Johan	Municipal merger
Hølen	Vestby Municipality	Akershus	1837–1943	Ladested	Karl III Johan	Municipal merger
Setermoen	Bardu Municipality	Troms	1999–1999	By	Kommunestyre	Disallowed by government
Sogndal	Sokndal Municipality	Rogaland	1798–1944	Ladested	Christian VII	Municipal merger
Son	Vestby Municipality	Akershus	1604–1963	Ladested	Christian IV	Municipal merger

== Photo gallery of Norway's main cities ==
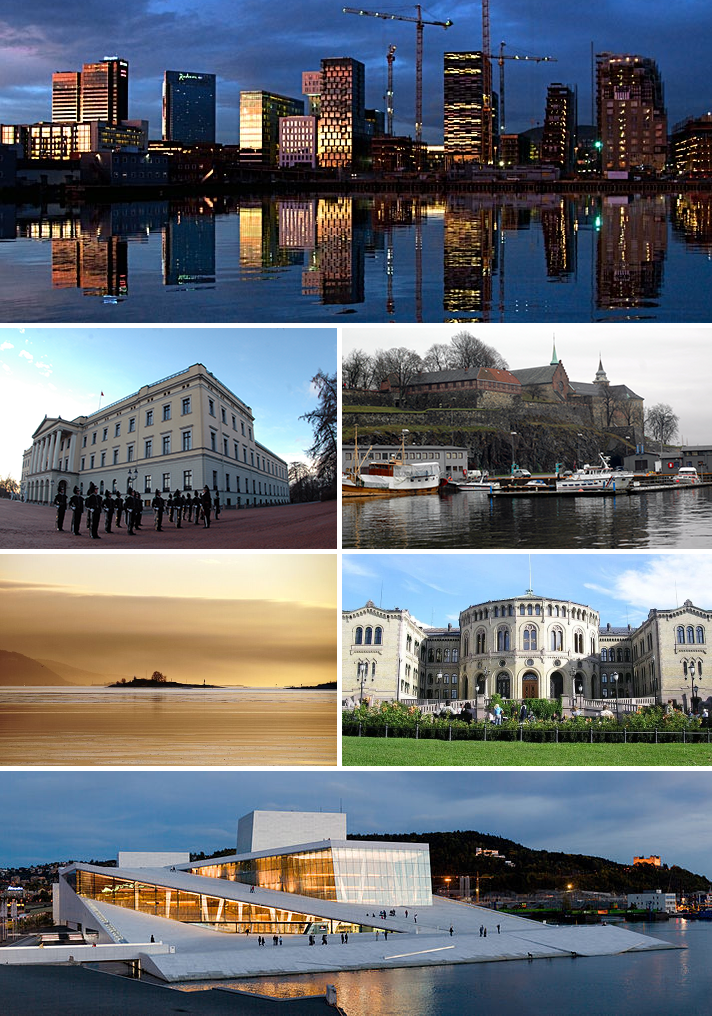
Oslo, the capital of Norway and among the fastest growing cities in Europe

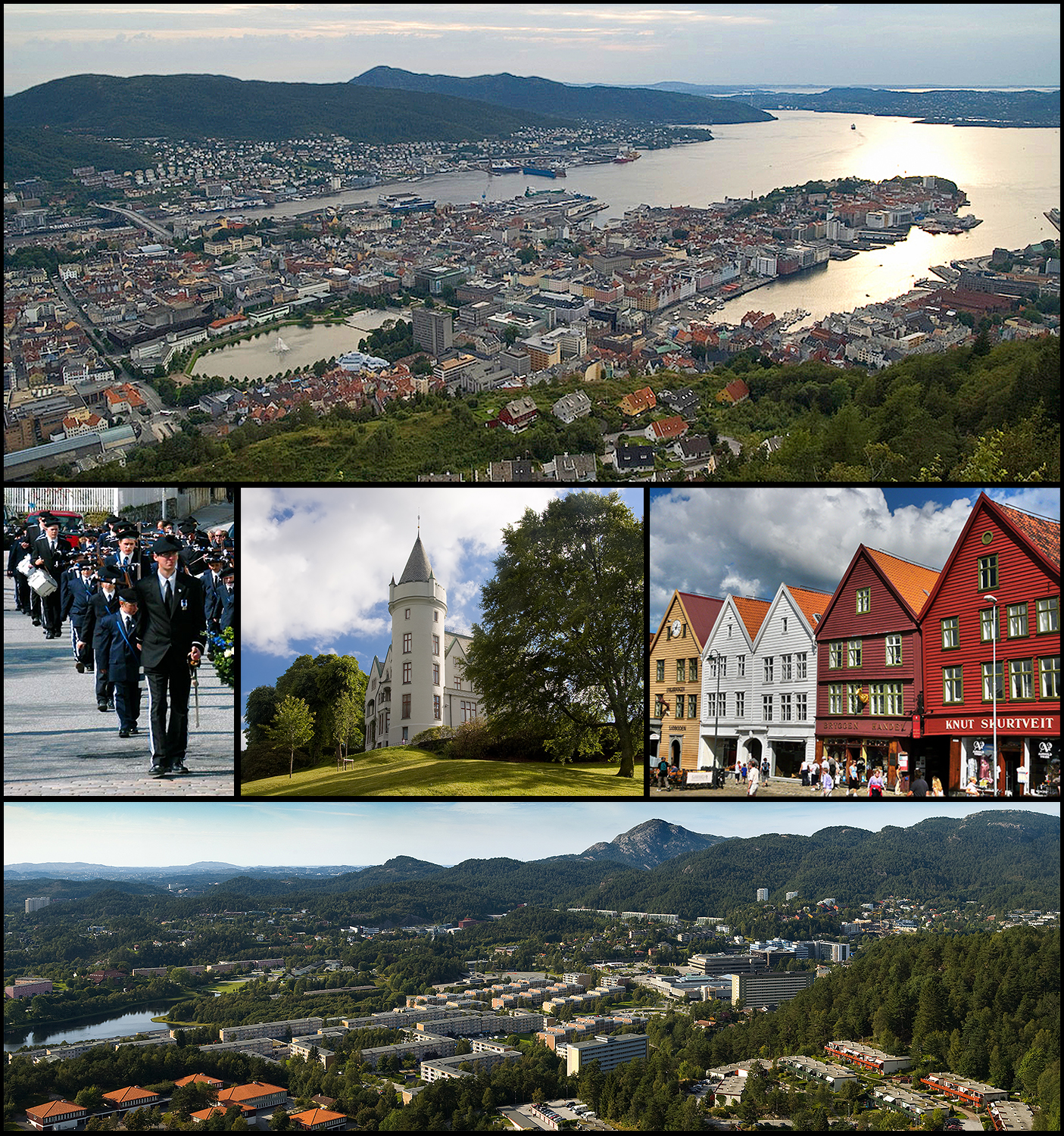
Bergen, the capital of Vestland county

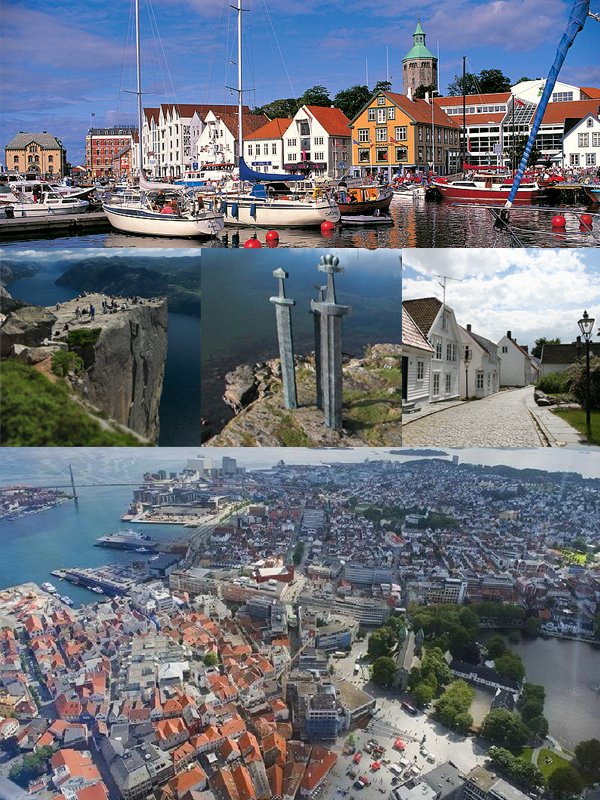
Stavanger, the "oil capital" of Norway and capital city of Rogaland county

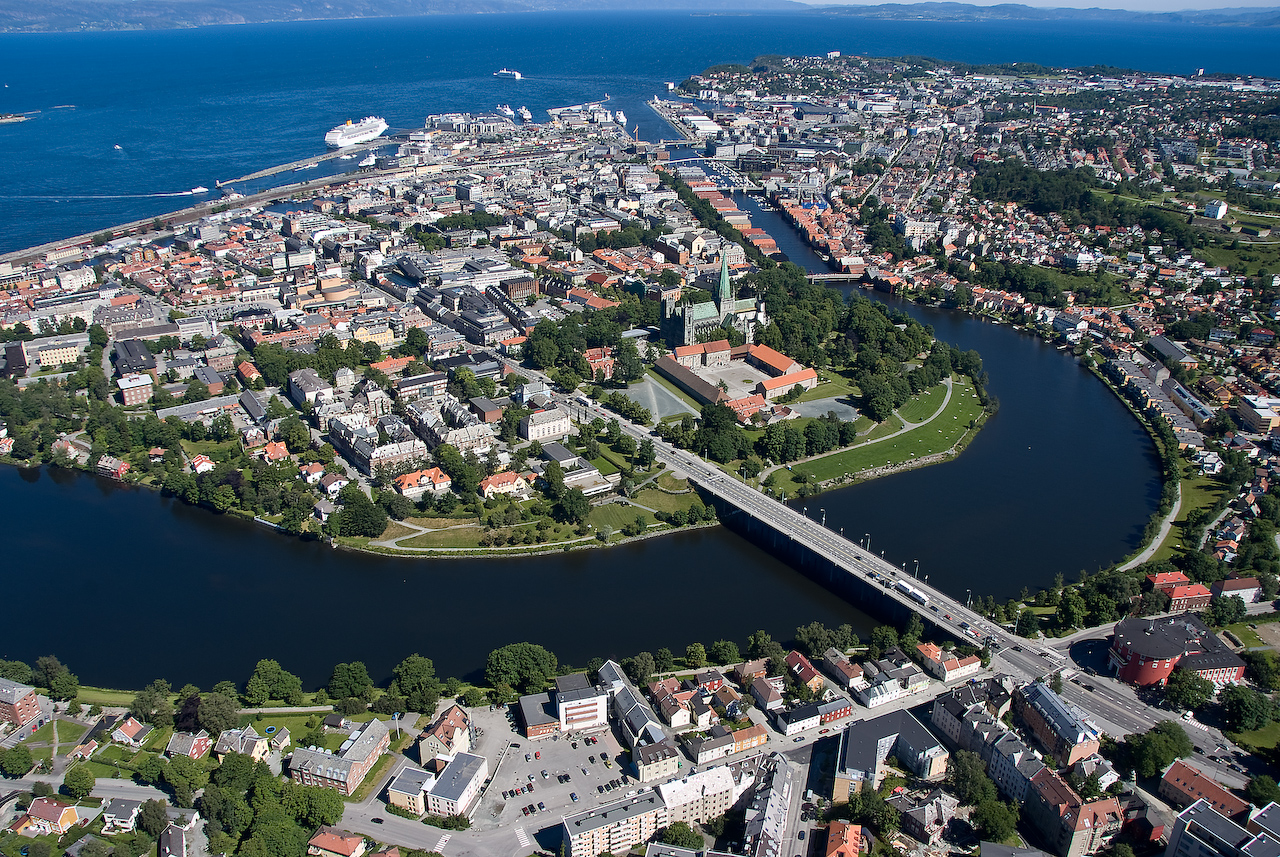
Trondheim, the largest city in Trøndelag county

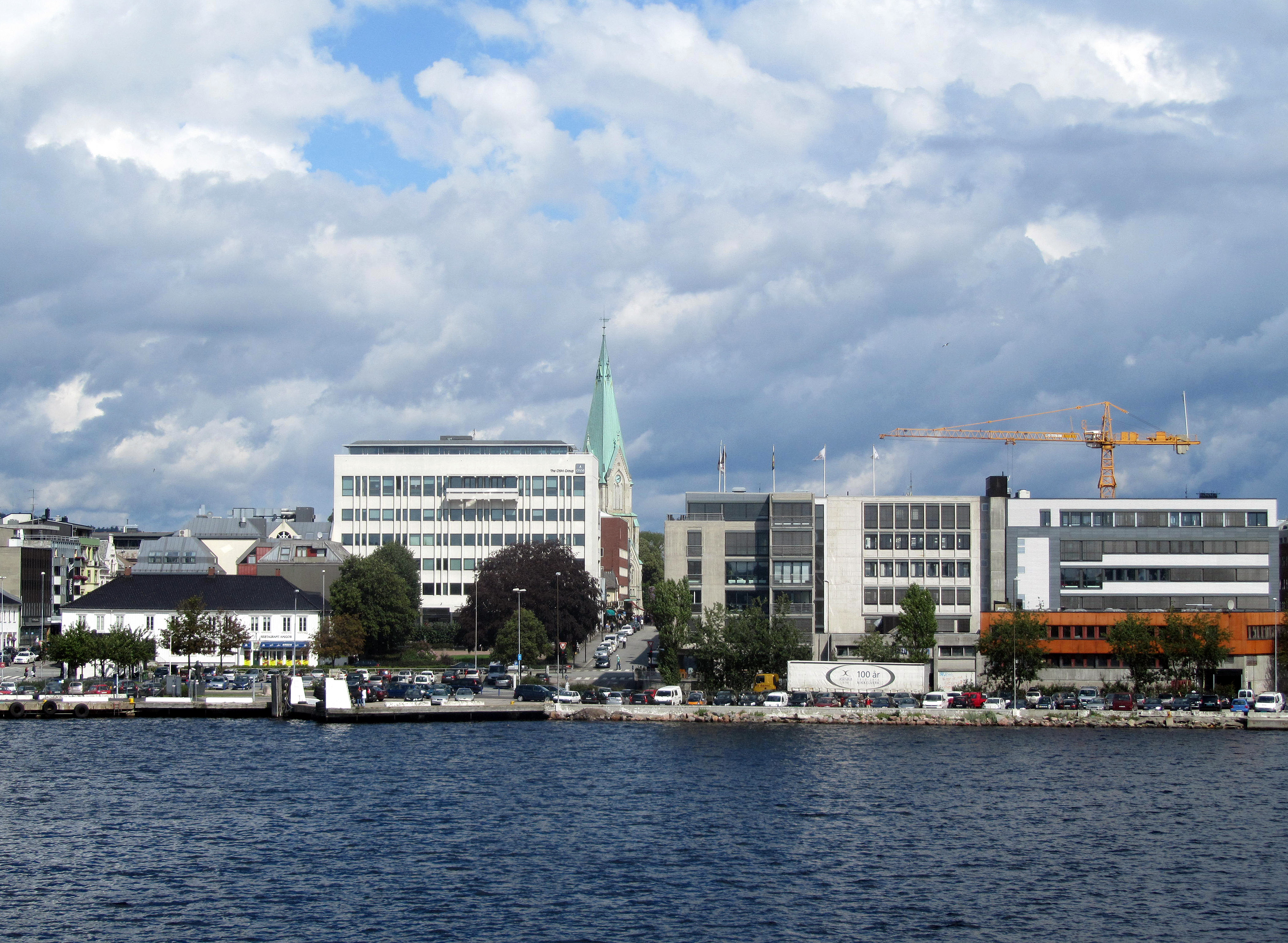
Kristiansand, the biggest city and capital of Agder county

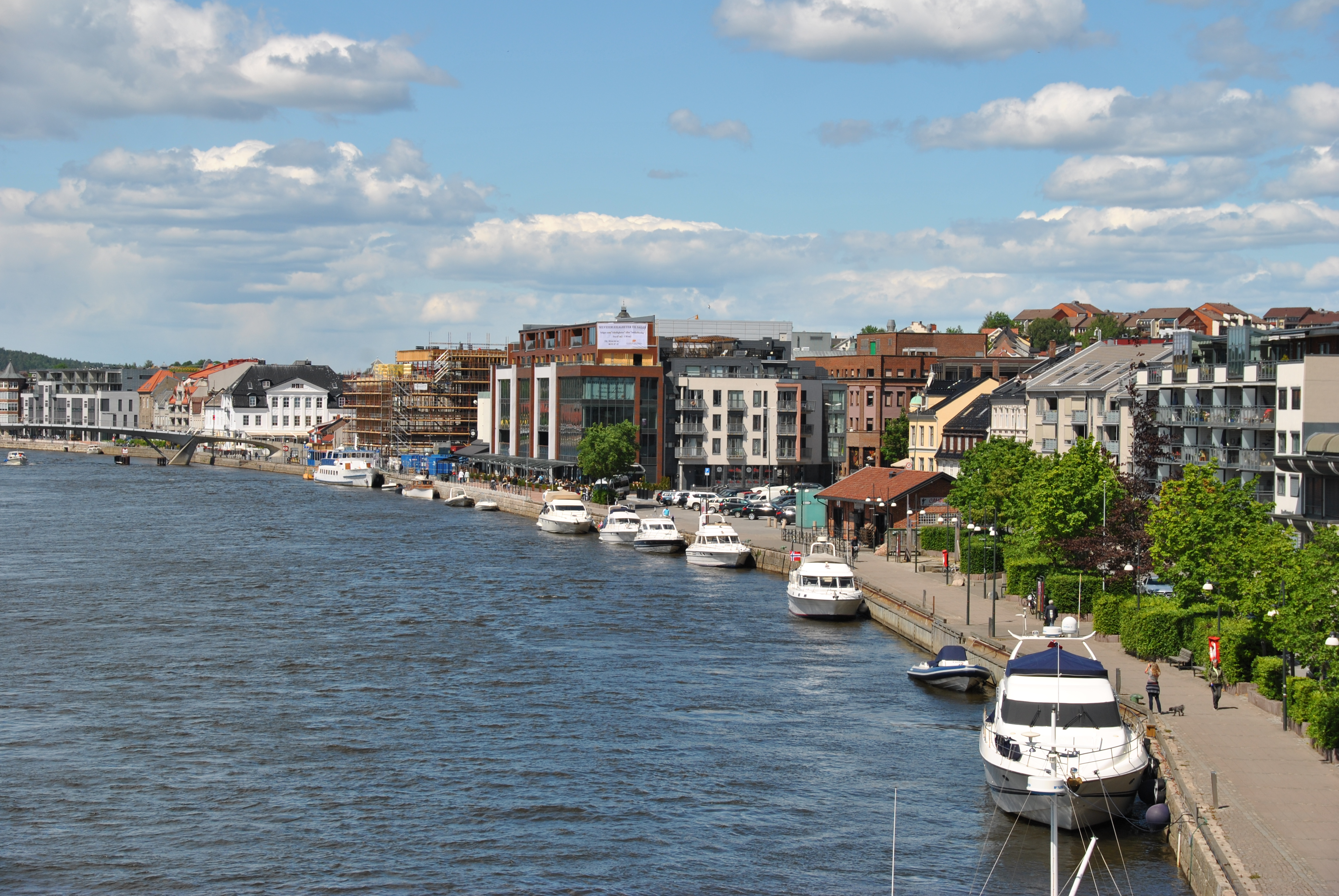
Fredrikstad, the biggest city in Østfold county and one of the 20 biggest cities in Norway

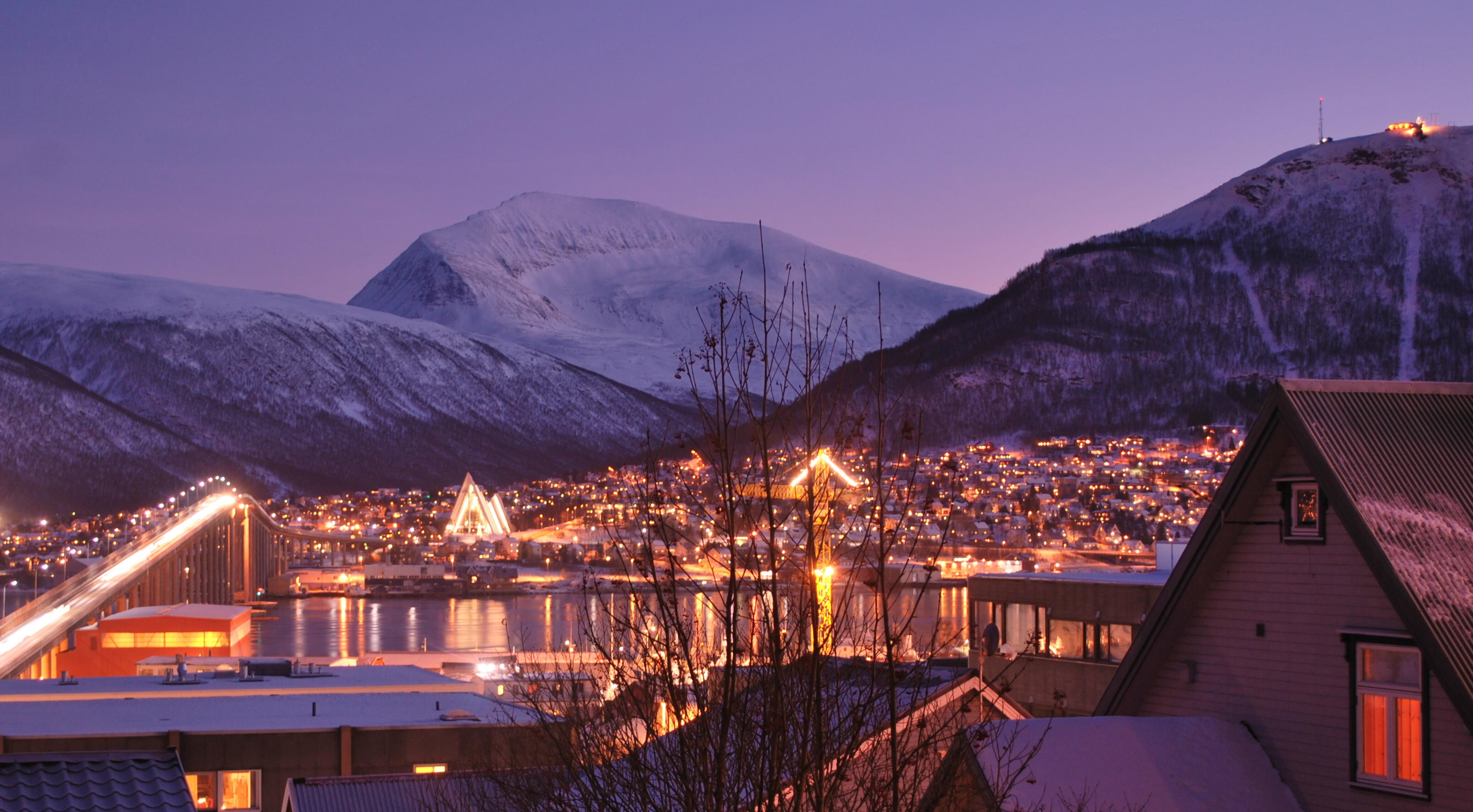
Tromsø, the capital of Troms county

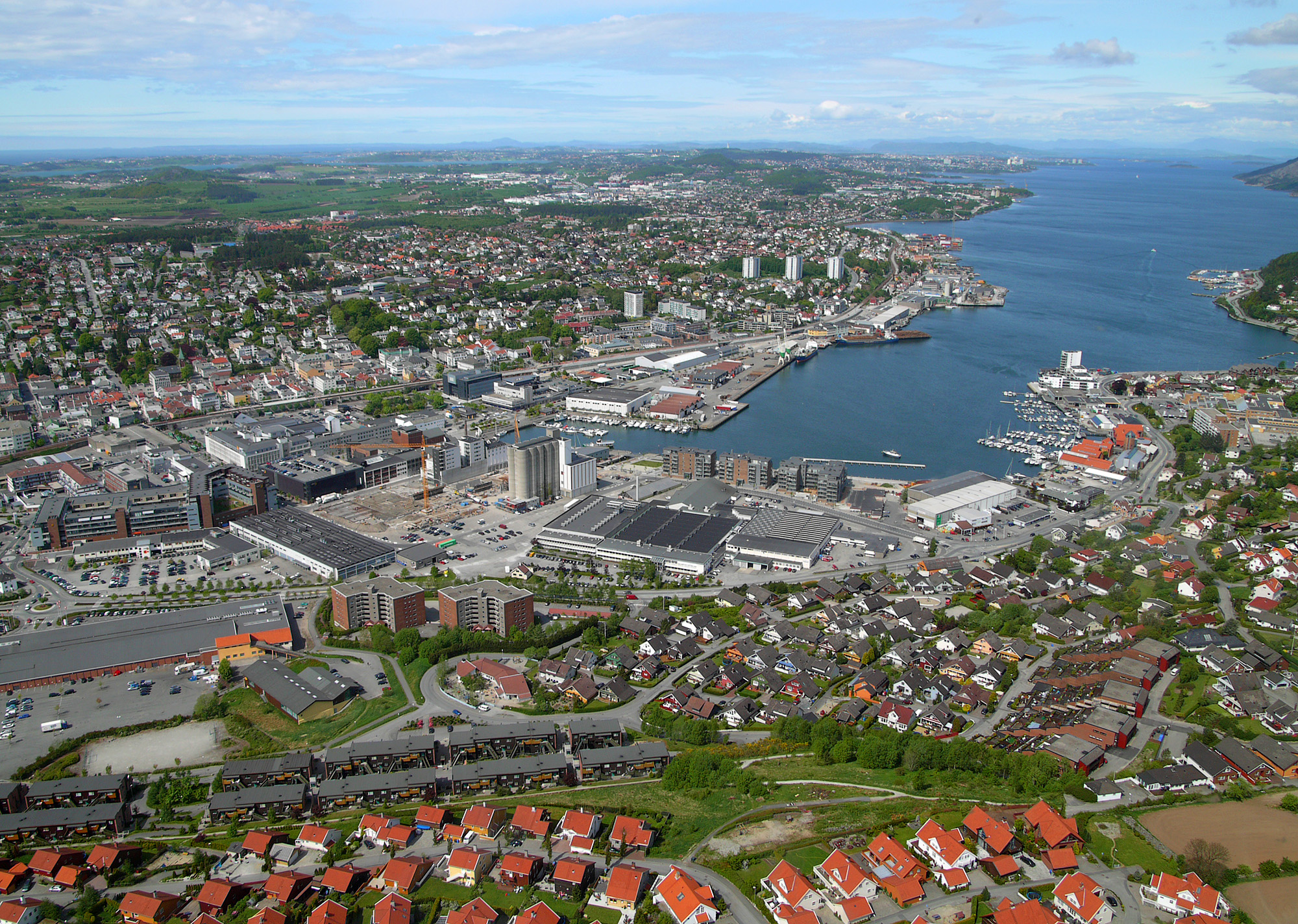
Sandnes, the second largest city in Rogaland after Stavanger

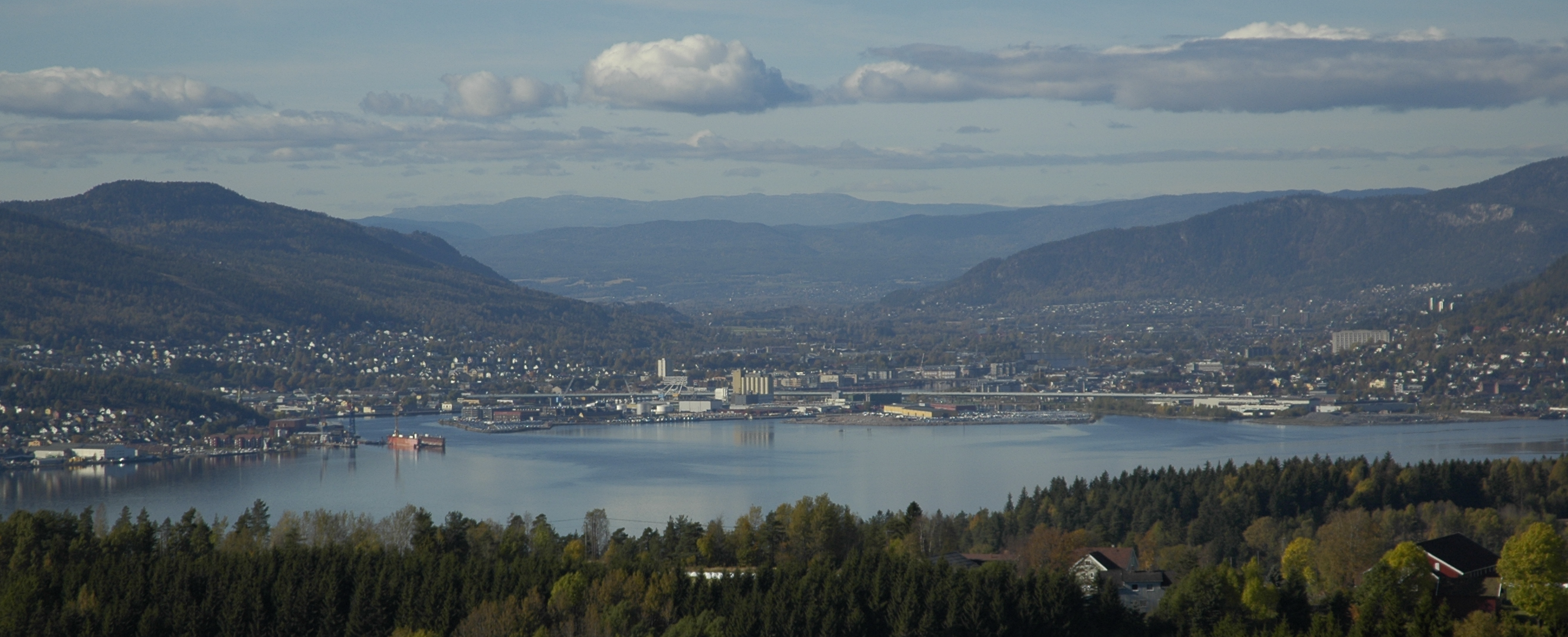
Drammen, the largest city in and capital of Buskerud county

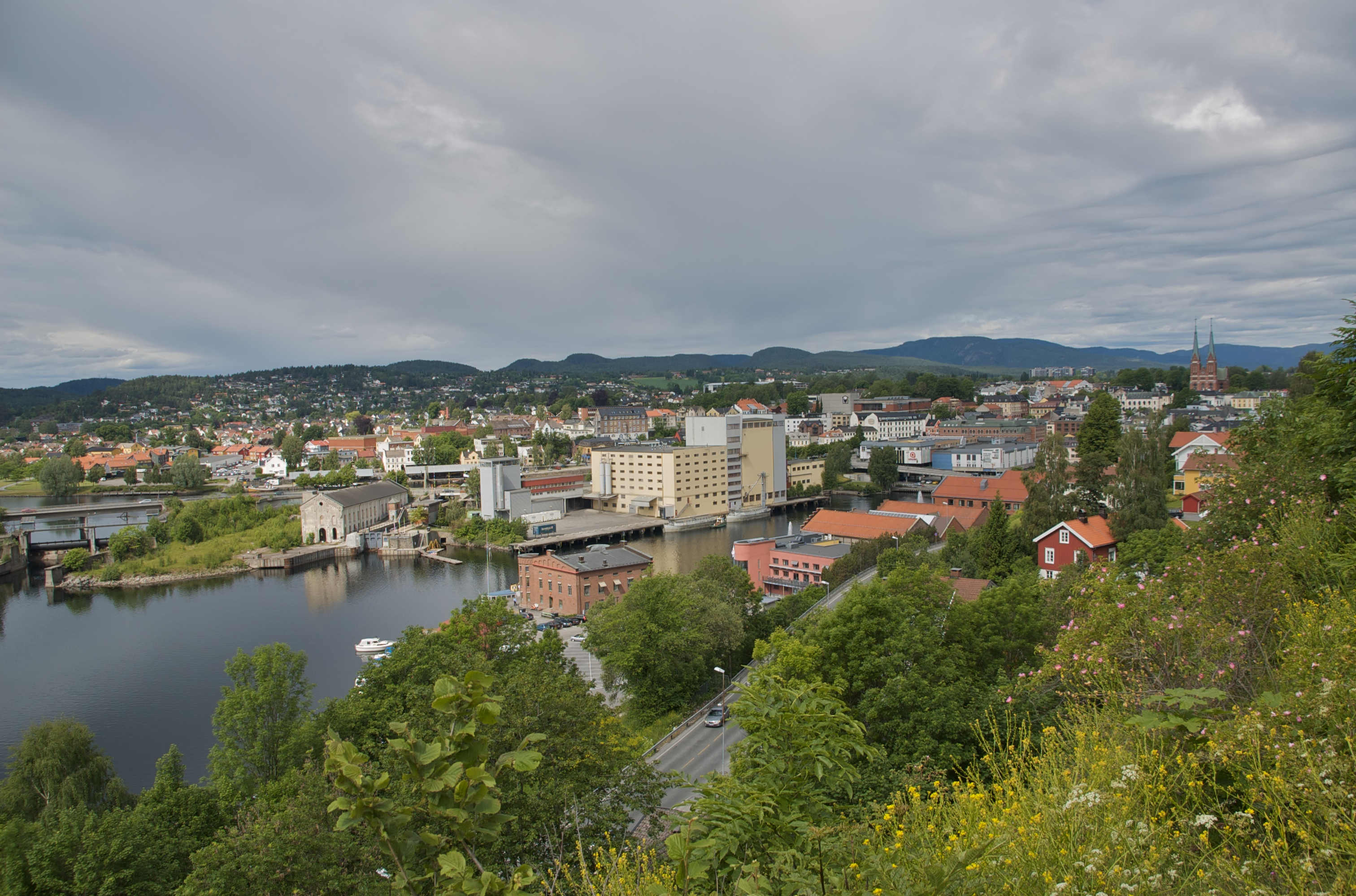
Skien

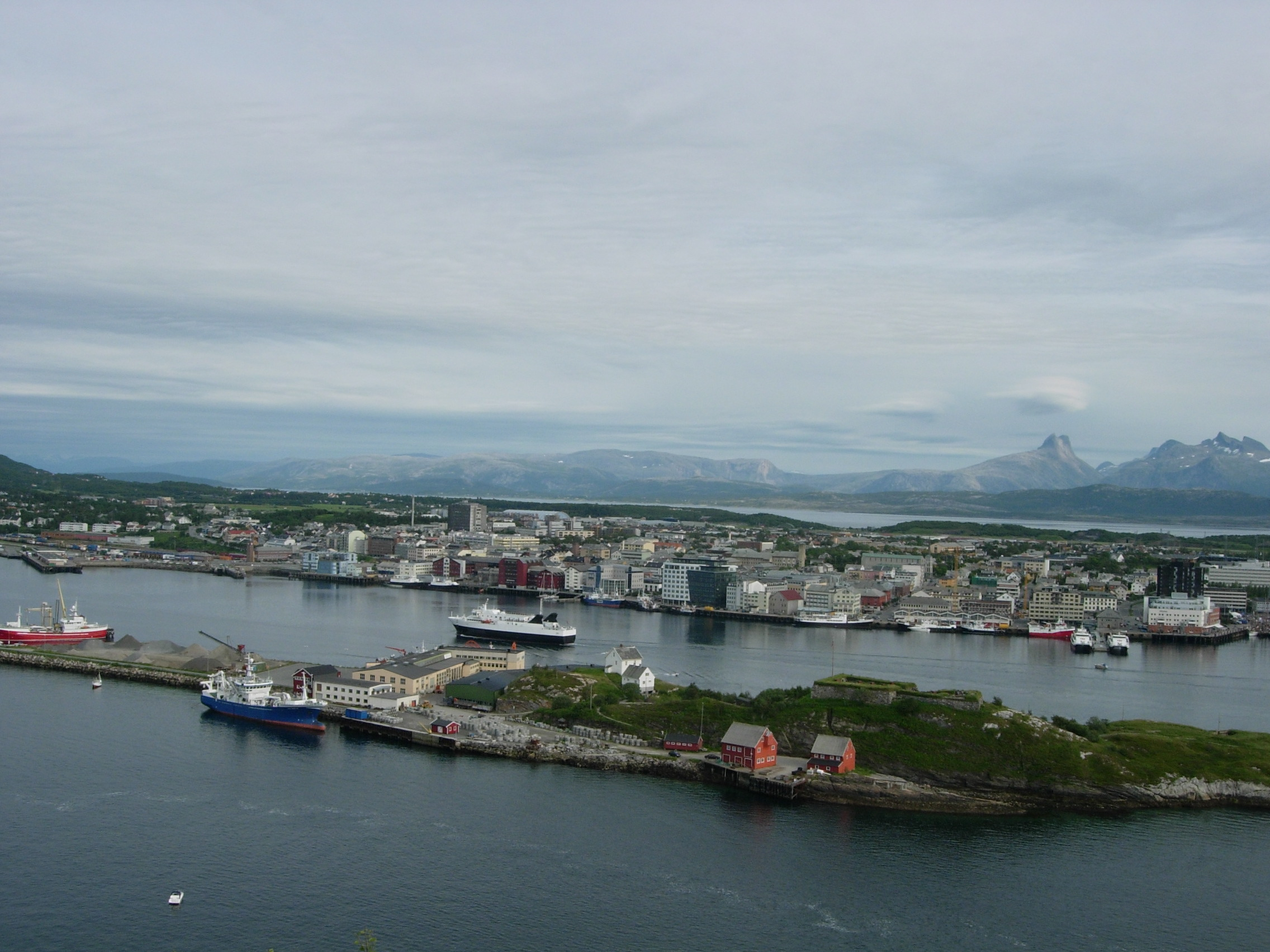
Bodø

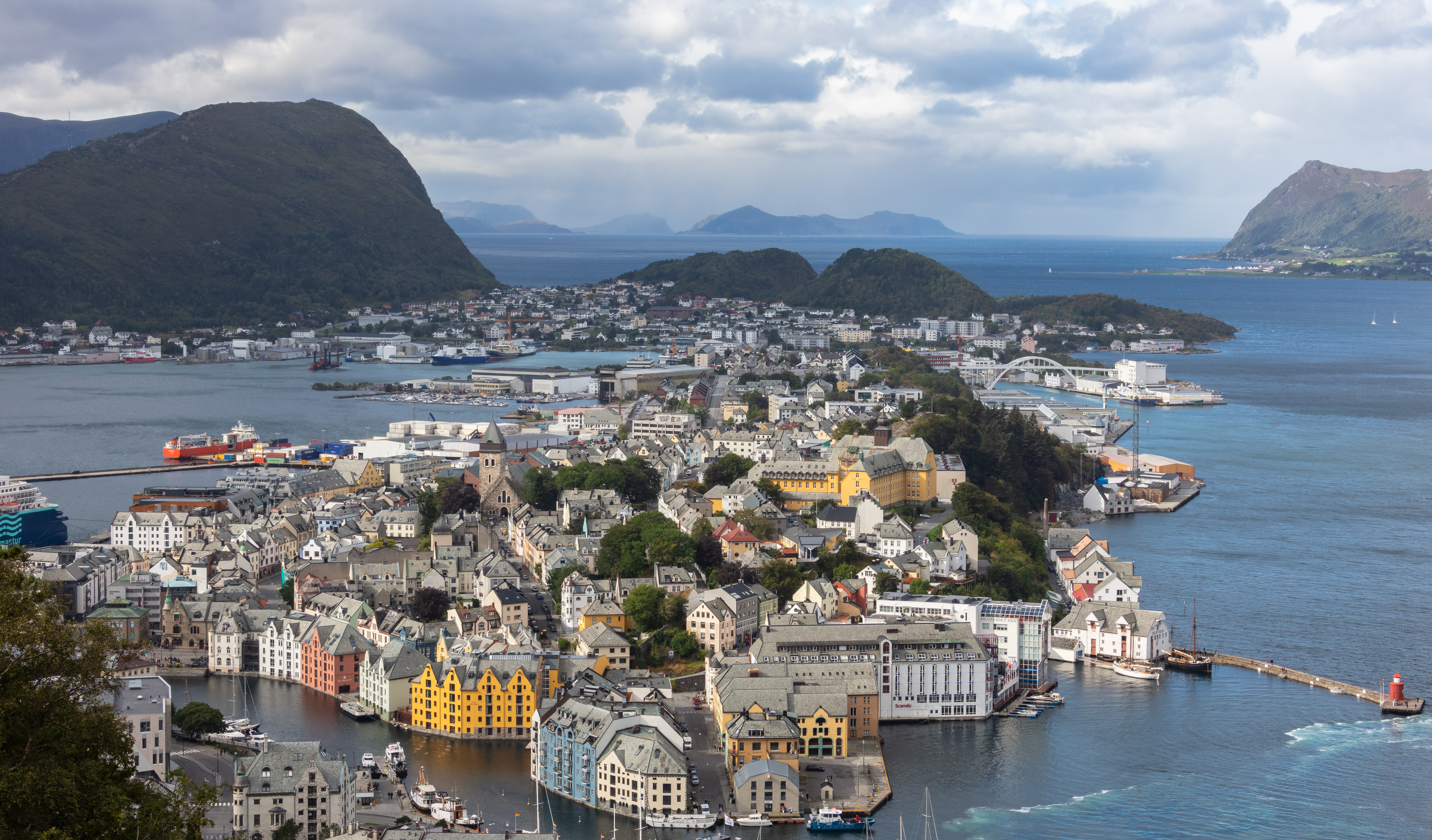
Ålesund

== See also ==
- List of cities in Europe
- List of urban areas in Norway by population
- Lists of villages in Norway
- List of settlements in Svalbard and Jan Mayen
