= Kjøpstad =

Scandinavian term for a market town

A kjøpstad (historically kjøbstad, kjöbstad, or kaupstad, from Old Norse: kaupstaðr) is an old Scandinavian term for a market town in Denmark–Norway for several hundred years. Kjøpstads were places of trade and exporting materials (e.g. timber, flour, iron and other common goods). Towns were given the "dignity" or rank of being referred to as a kjøpstad when they reached a certain population. They had an established means of industry and other notable items, such as dockyards, steam mills, forges, churches, and grammar schools. The citizens of a kjøpstad could buy and sell goods and conduct other economic activities.

== Ladested ==
Norway also had a subordinate category to the market town, the "small seaport" (Norwegian: ladested or lossested). These were ports or harbours with a monopoly to import and export goods and materials in both the port and a surrounding outlying district. These places were usually subordinate to the nearest kjøpstad. Typically, these were locations for exporting timber and importing grain and goods. Local farm goods and timber sales were all required to pass through merchants at either a small seaport (ladested) or a market town (kjøpstad) before export, which encouraged local merchants to ensure trading went through them, which was so effective in limiting unsupervised sales (smuggling) that customs revenues increased from less than 30% of the total tax revenues in 1600 to more than 50% of the total taxes by 1700.

== History ==
Norway developed market towns at a much later period than other parts of Europe. The reasons for this late development are complex but include the sparse population, lack of urbanisation, no real manufacturing industries, and no cash economy.

The first kjøpstads date back to the 11th and 12th centuries when the King of Norway sought to centralise commerce in specific places that offered strategic significance, providing a local economic base for constructing fortifications and a population for the area's defence. It also restricted the Hanseatic League merchants from trading in places other than those designated. King Olaf established a market town in Bergen in the 11th century, and it soon became the residence of many wealthy families.

Import and export were to be conducted only through market towns to allow oversight of commerce and to simplify the imposition of excise taxes and customs duties. This practice encouraged growth in areas with strategic significance, providing a local economic base for constructing fortifications and a sufficient population to defend the area. It also restricted Hanseatic League merchants from trading in areas other than those designated.

Under the 1838 formannskapsdistrikt law, kjøpstads and ladesteds were granted the ability to set up a town council just like the other cities and rural municipalities in the country. Most kjøpstads and ladesteds did this immediately, although some did not.

Norwegian "market towns" died out and were replaced by free markets during the 19th century. During the 1950s, there were 44 kjøpstads and 20 ladesteds that had their town councils in Norway. In 1952, the legal distinctions for both the ladested and kjøpstad were removed from the Constitution of Norway, and they were legally the same as any other town (by) in Norway. In 1992, all municipalities received equal status under the law, finally removing all legal differences between town and rural municipalities. Since then, a town designation has been a title or historical name with no legal status.

== Gallery ==
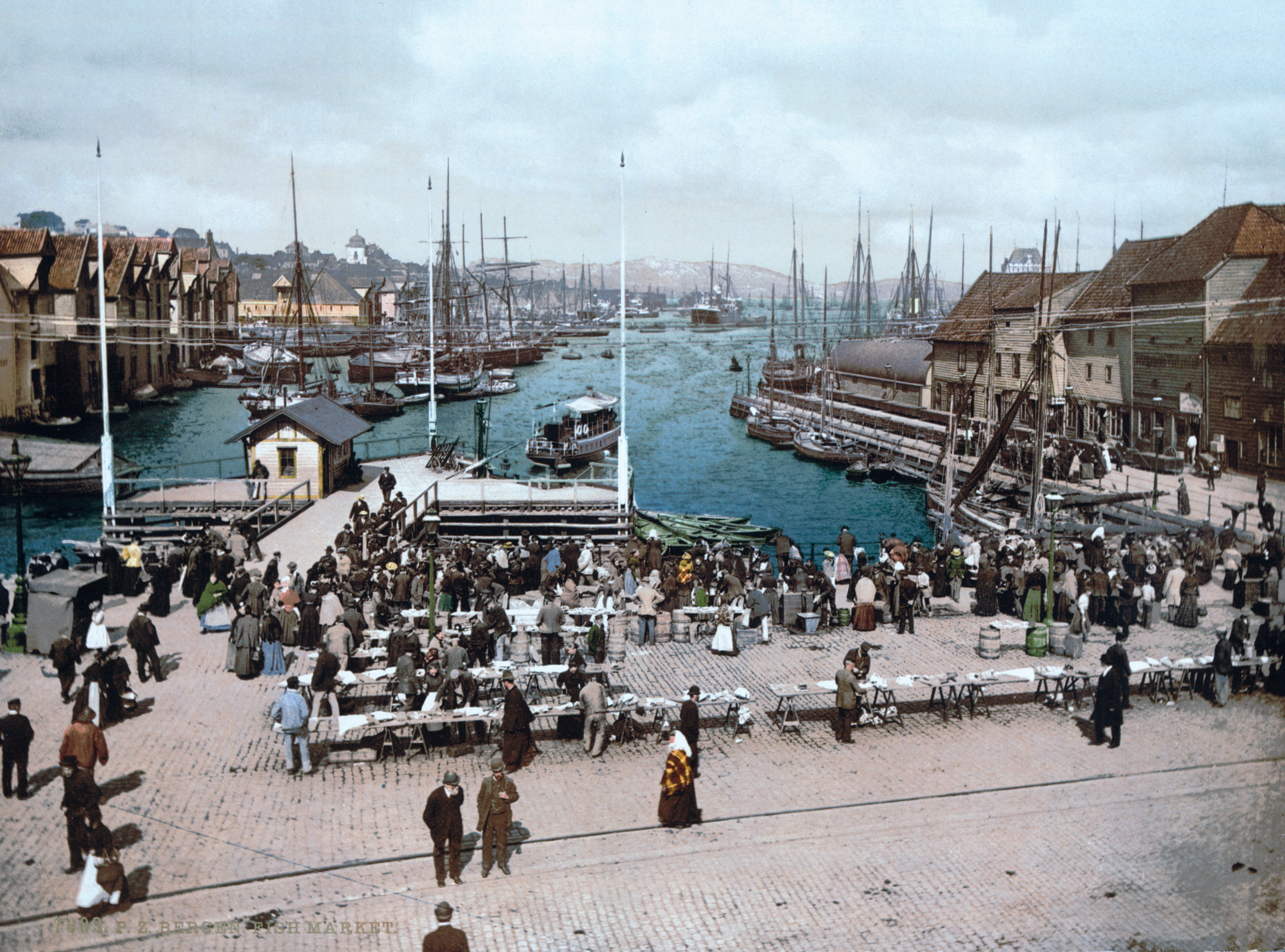
Fish market, Bergen, Norway, c. 1890

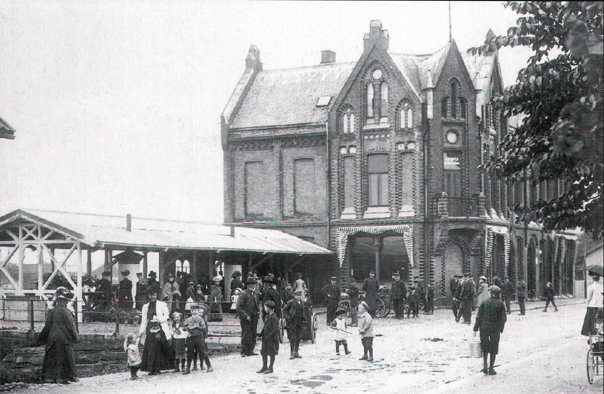
Market and customs house, Porsgrunn, c. 1891-1910

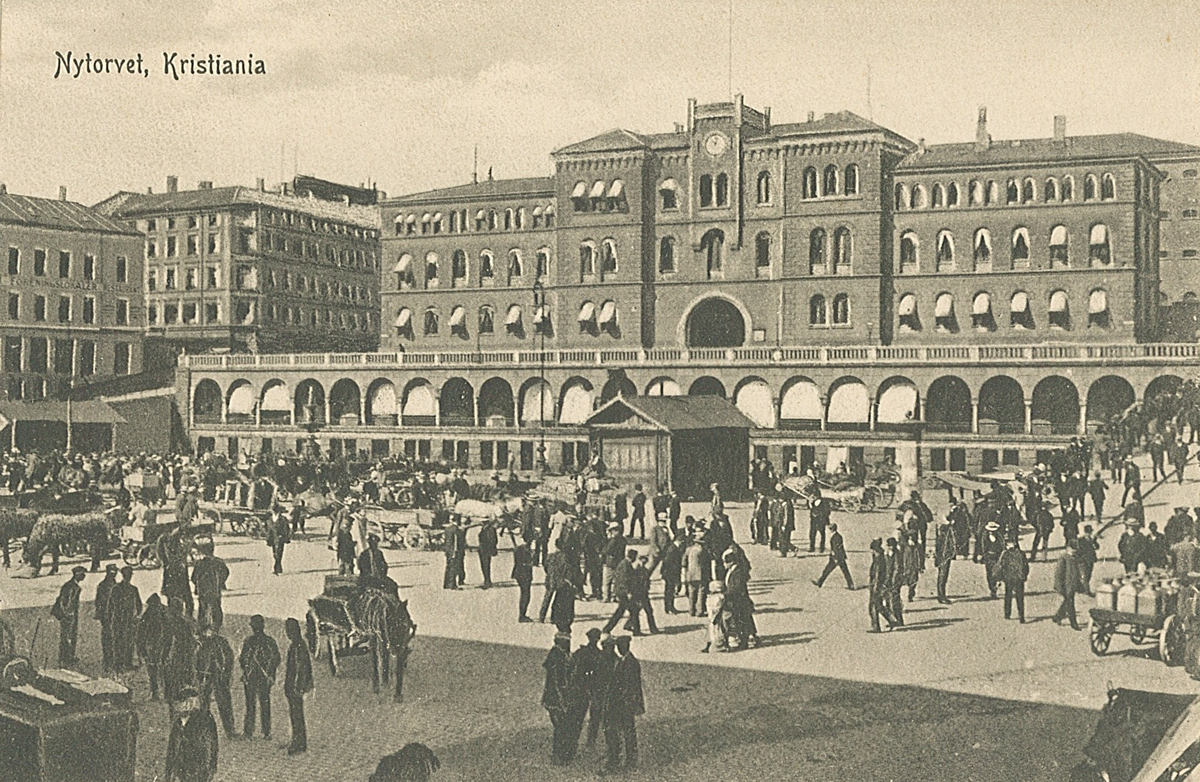
Market square, Youngstorget Nytorvet, c. 1915-20

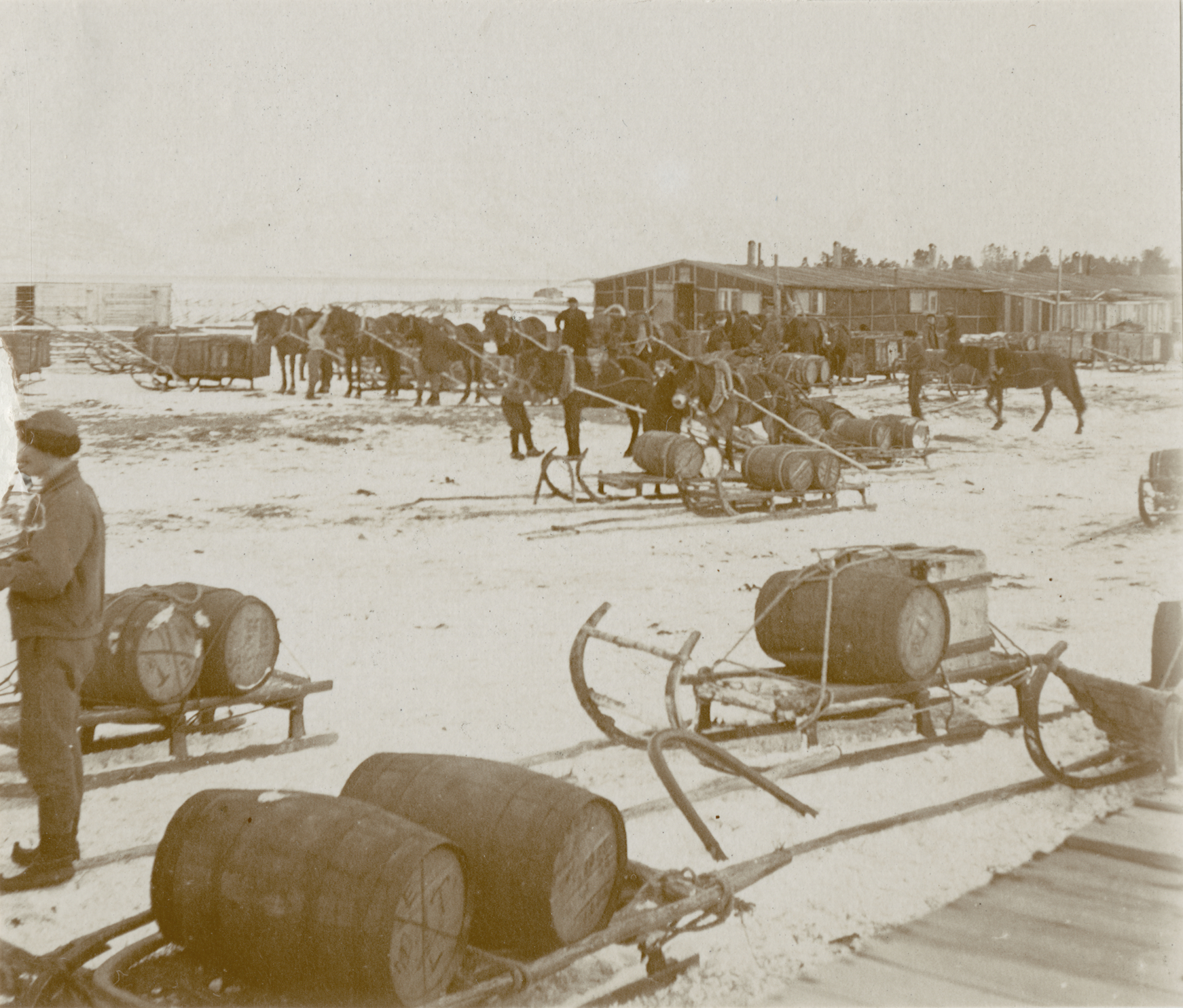
Norwegian market, Skibotn, Storfjord Municipality, Troms, 1917

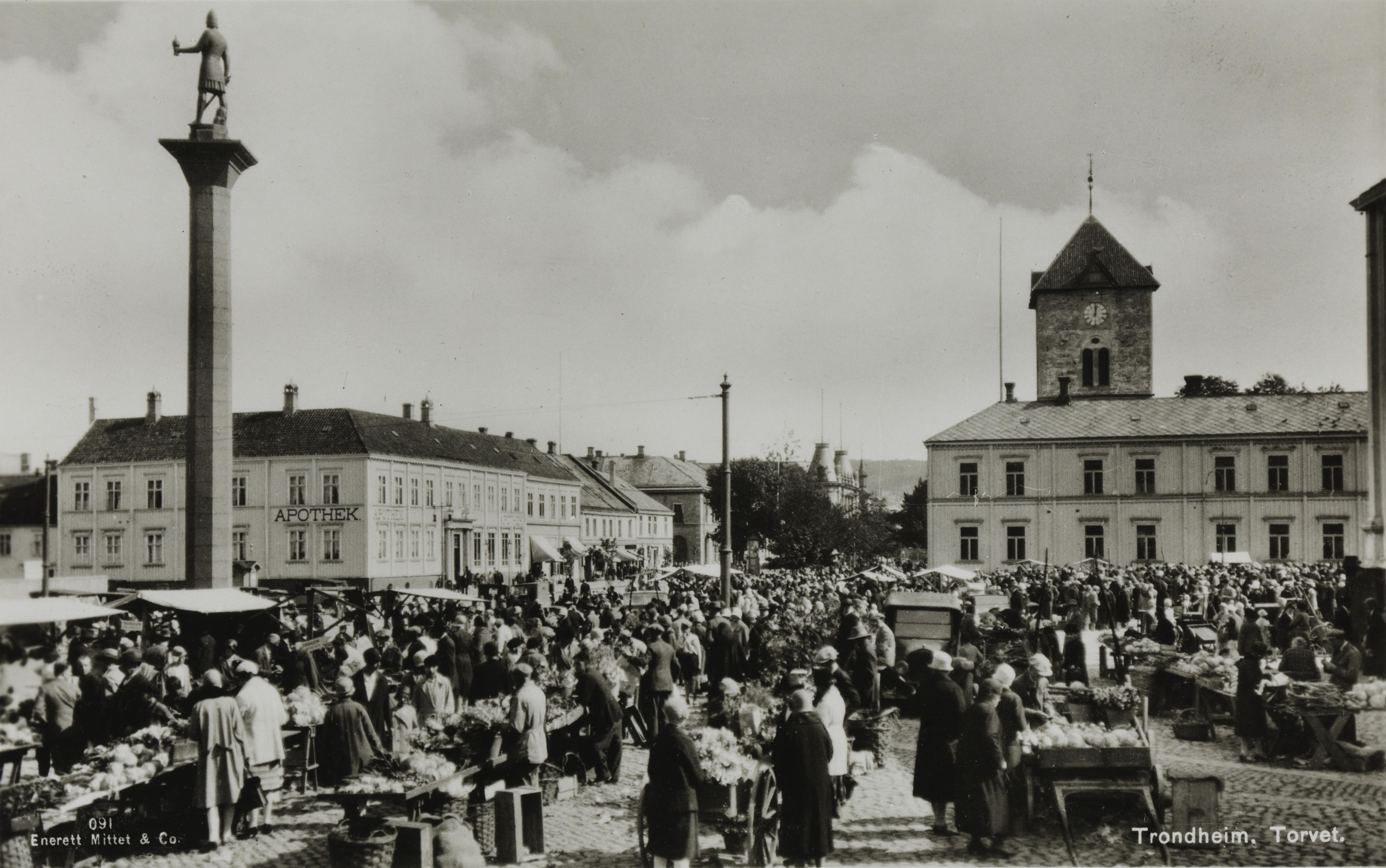
Norwegian market, Torvet, Trondheim, c. 1921-35

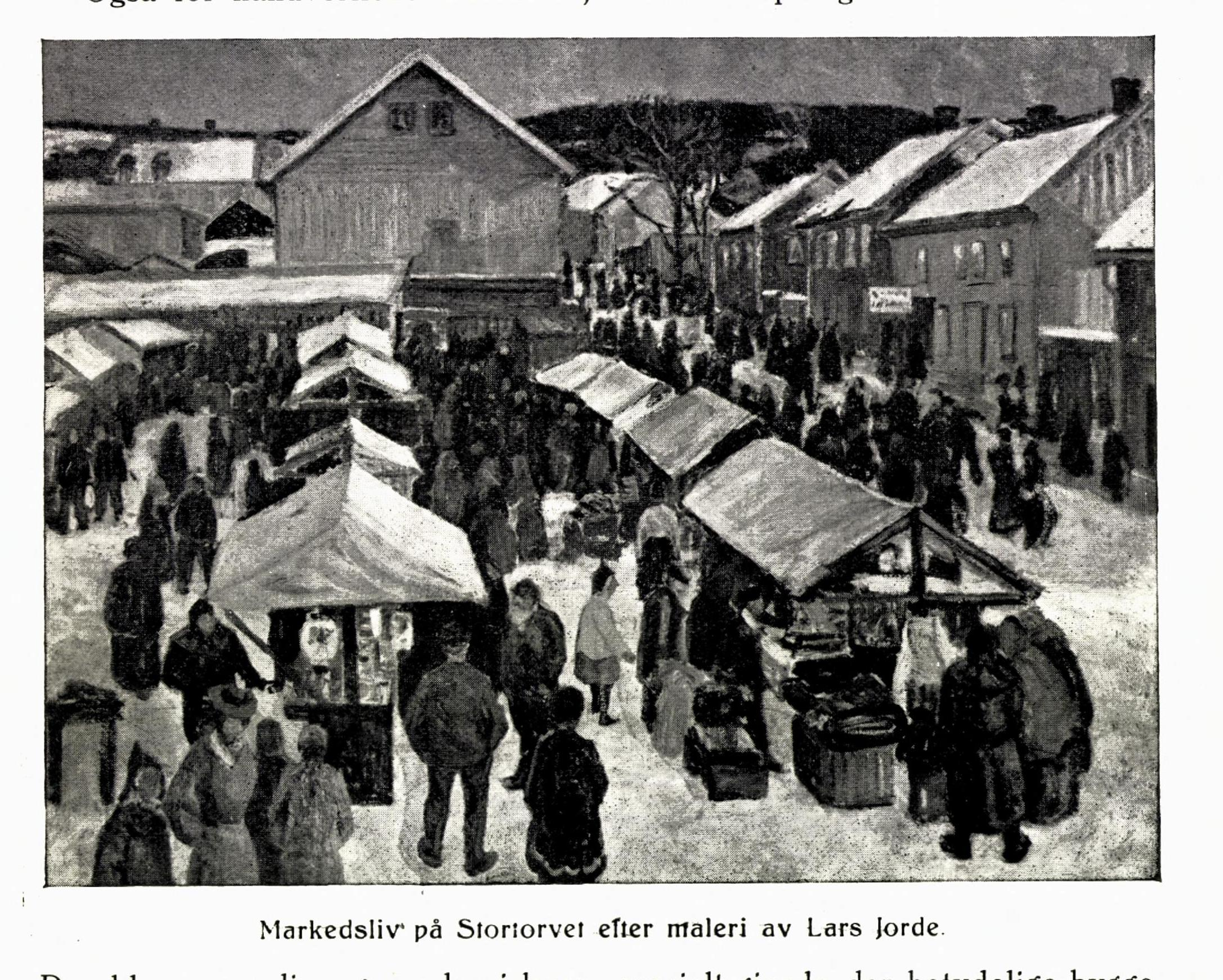
Market (illustration), c. 1927

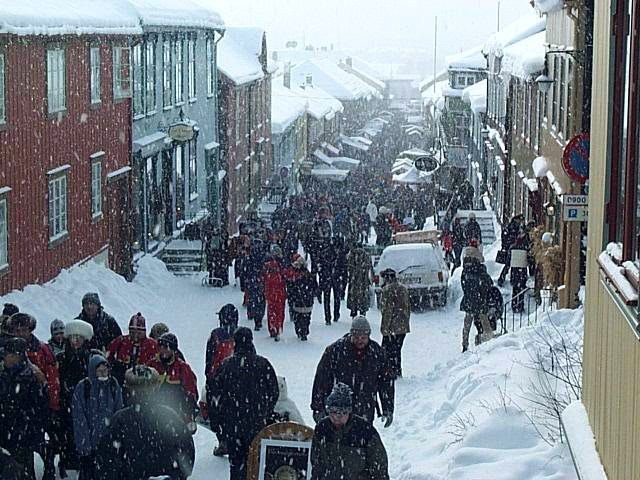
Traditional winter market, Røros, 2001

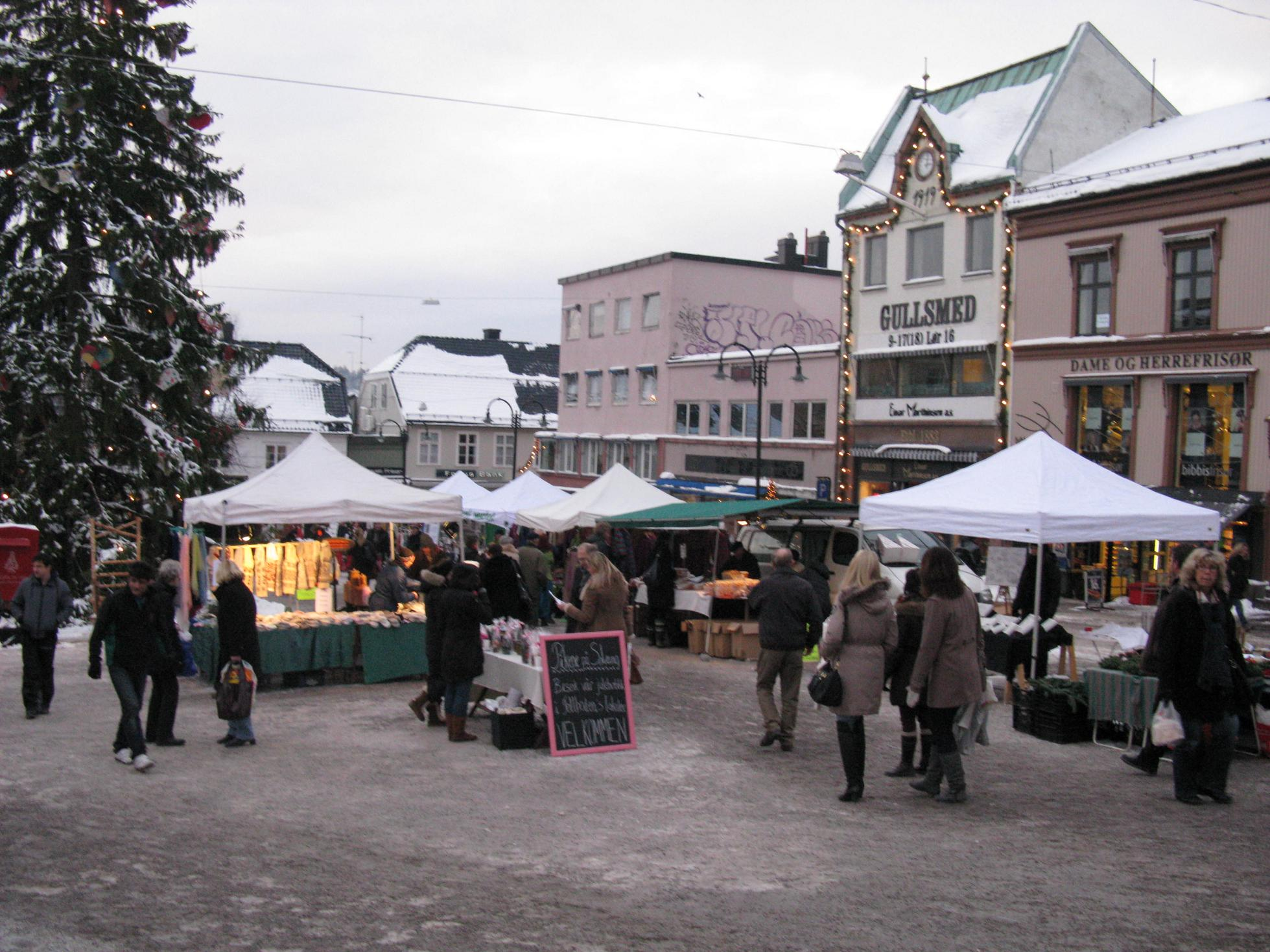
Market, Tønsberg, Norway, 2010

== See also ==
- Köping
- Kaupang
- Købstad
