= Lægerneset =

Peninsula in Svalbard, Norway

Coordinates: 77°31′30″N 14°45′12″E

Lægerneset (English: Camp Point) is a headland on the eastern side of Recherche Fjord, Svalbard. It was once known as "Whale Head" or "Edge's Point", which was named after the English merchant and whaler Thomas Edge. An English whaling station was situated on the point in the first half of the 17th century.
