= Recherche Fjord =

Fjord on the south side of Bellsund, Spitsbergen

Coordinates: 77°31.5′N 14°40′E

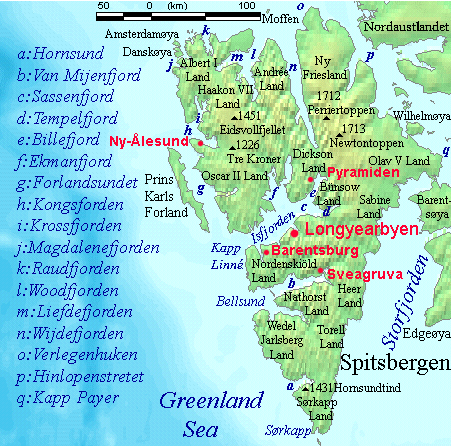
Recherche Fjord is located on the west coast of Spitsbergen.

Recherche Fjord (Norwegian: Recherchefjorden) is a small fjord on the south side of Bellsund, Spitsbergen. The glacier Recherchebreen debouches into the fjord from south, and Renardbreen from west.

== History ==
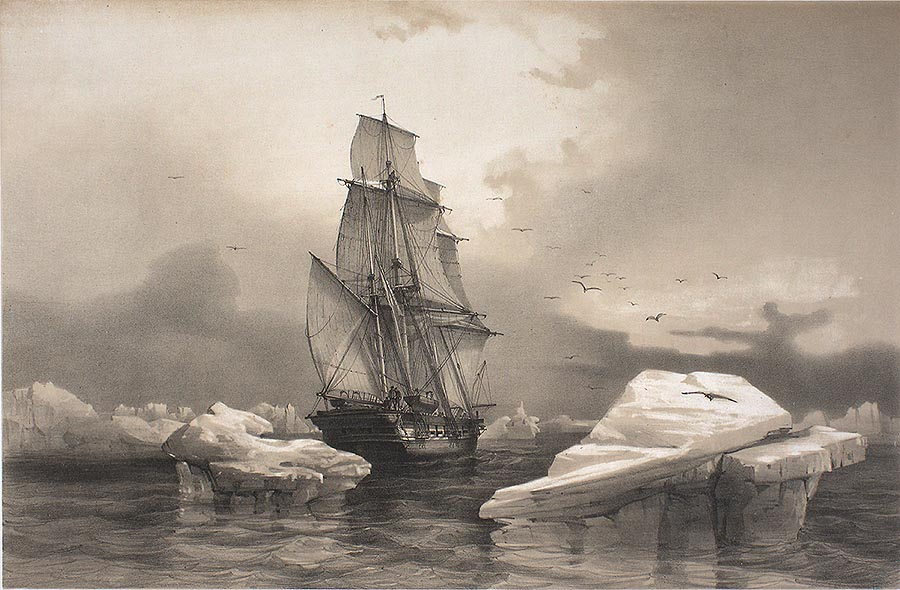
The French corvette La Recherche, which the fjord was renamed after in 1838–39.

The fjord is named after the French cruiser La Recherche, which visited Spitsbergen in 1838 and 1839. The Dutch had named it in the early 17th century Schoonhaven (English: Beautiful Bay). The English commonly called it Ice Bay. The whaling industries of the Netherlands and of the United Kingdom established shore stations within the fjord in the first half of the seventeenth century, most notably Lægerneset on the eastern side of the fjord.
