= Recherchebreen =

Glacier in Svalbard, Norway

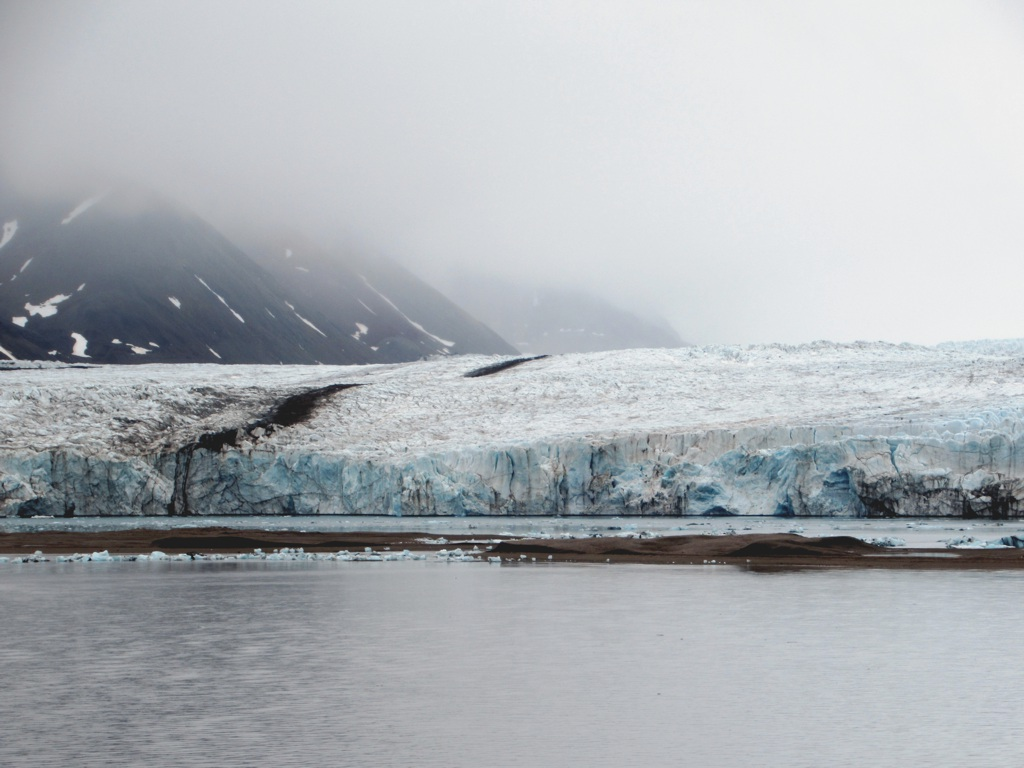

- Location within Svalbard
- Type: Glacier
- Location: Wedel Jarlsberg Land; Spitsbergen, Svalbard
- Coordinates: 77.4368°N 14.8192°E
- Length: 16 kilometers (9.9 mi)

Recherchebreen is a glacier in Wedel Jarlsberg Land at Spitsbergen, Svalbard. The glacier has a length of about 16 kilometers (9.9 mi). It is located in a valley between Martinfjella and Observatoriefjellet, and debouches into Recherche Fjord. Among its tributary glaciers are Foldnutfonna, Varderyggfonna, Dollfusbreen, Ramondbreen and Bjørnbreen.
