= Wedel Jarlsberg Land =

Peninsula in Svalbard, Norway

Coordinates: 77°19′40″N 14°59′00″E

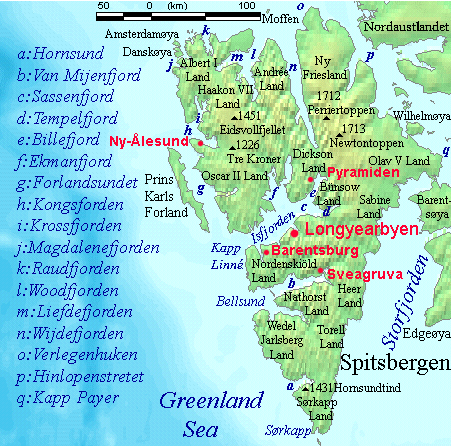
Wedel Jarlsberg Land is located on the southwestern part of Spitsbergen.

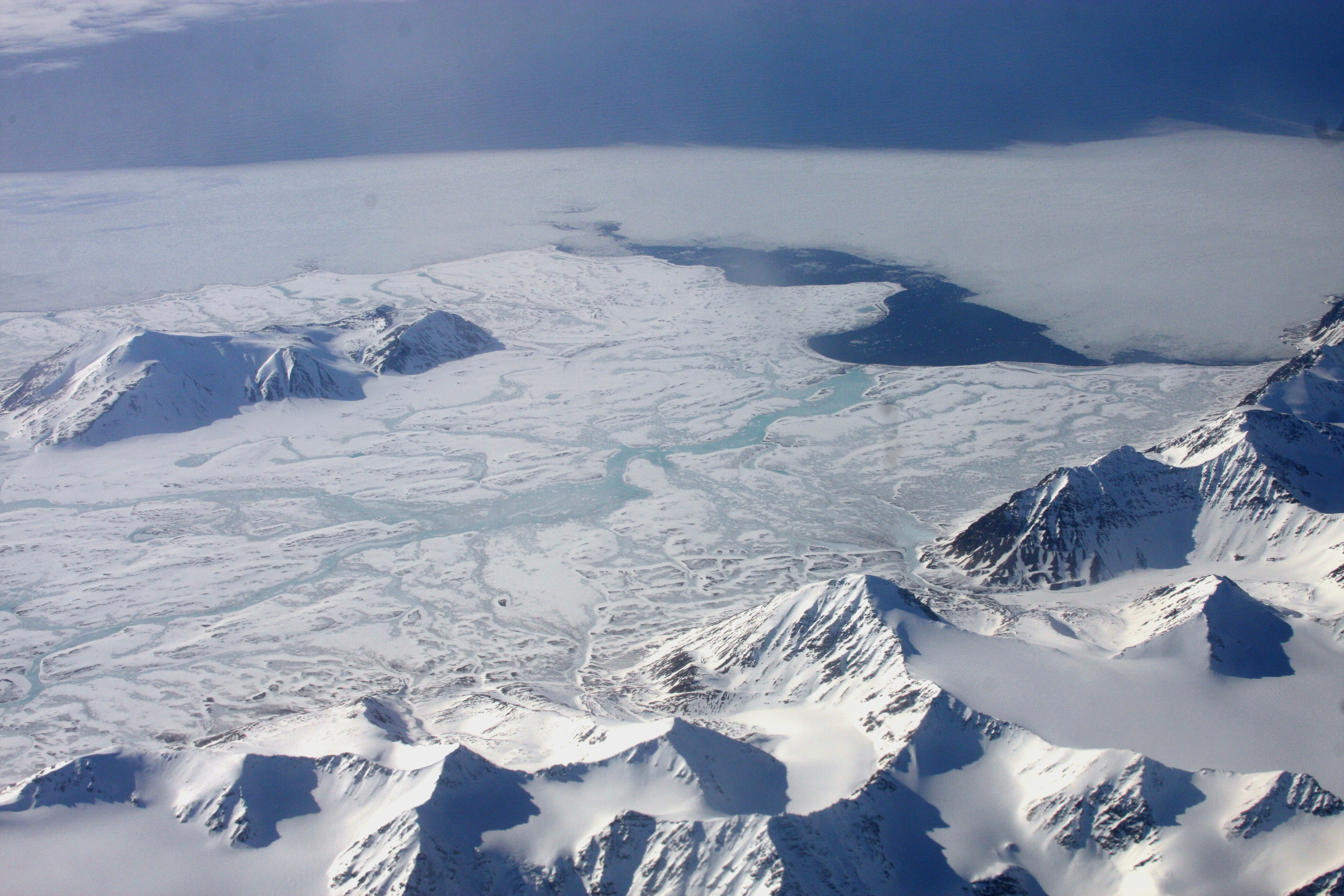
Dunderdalen, Wedel Jarlsberg Land, southwestern Spitsbergen. Seen from east towards west.

Wedel Jarlsberg Land is the land area between Van Keulenfjorden and Hornsund on the southwestern part of Spitsbergen, Svalbard. The area is largely covered with glaciers, and is completely within the Sør-Spitsbergen National Park.

Named after Baron Fritz Wedel Jarlsberg (1855-1942), Norwegian minister in Paris, to whose initiative and labour it was greatly due that Norway succeeded in acquiring the sovereignty of Svalbard by a treaty signed in Paris on February 9, 1920. Until then it had been regarded as no-man's-land. The northwestern part of the area was earlier called Orvin Land.
