= Scottbreen =

Glacier in Svalbard, Norway

Coordinates: 77.544°N 14.357°E

Scottbreen is a glacier in Wedel Jarlsberg Land at Spitsbergen, Svalbard. The glacier has a length of about 4.5 kilometers. It is located between Wijkanderberget and the ridge of Bohlinryggen, which separates Scottbreen from the glacier of Renardbreen.
