= Bohlinryggen =

Mountain ridge in Spitsbergen, Norway

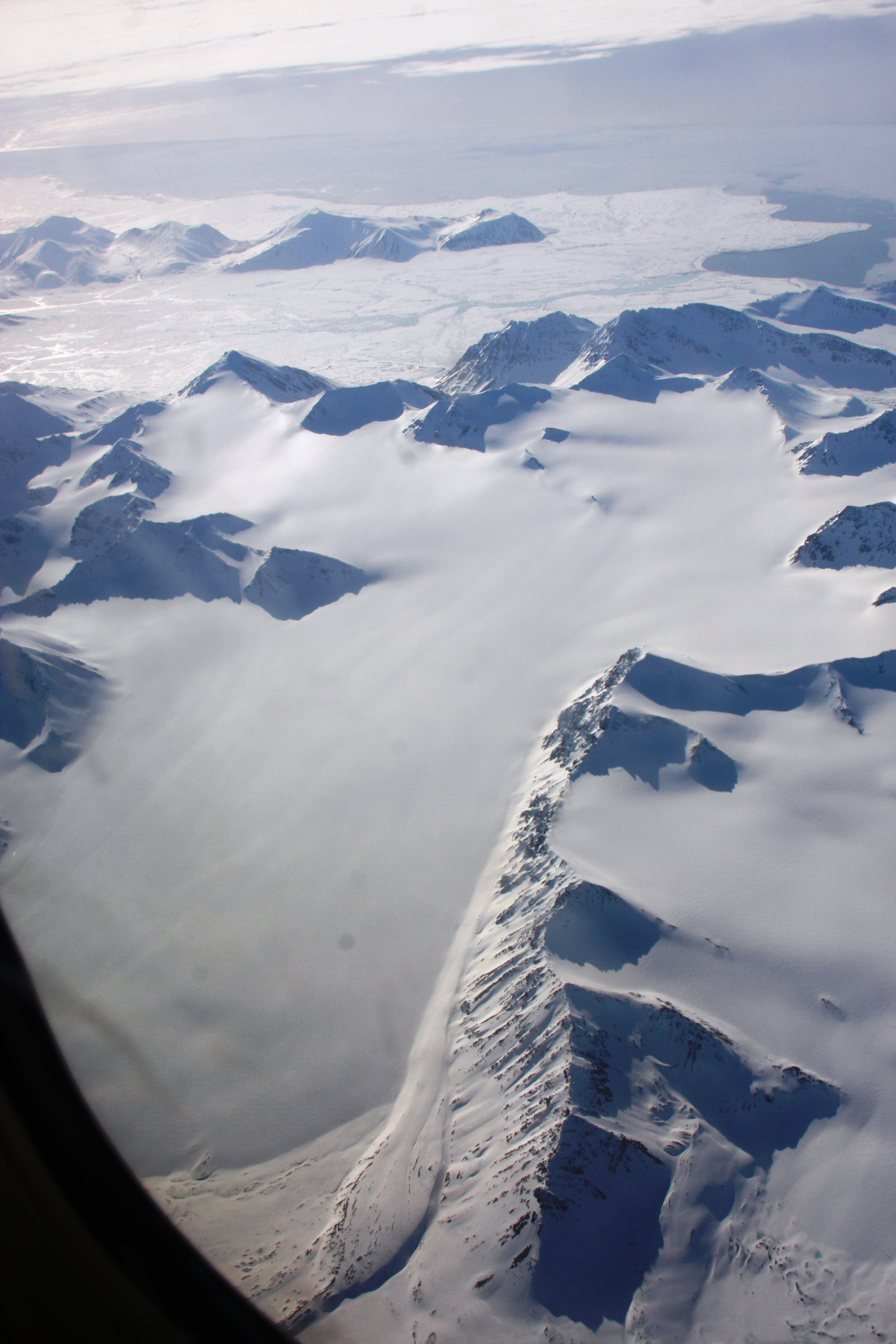
- Bohlinryggen in front with Renardbreen to the left. In the background is the valley of Dunderdalen.

Highest point
- Elevation: 716 m (2,349 ft)
- Coordinates: 77°32′06″N 14°23′34″E

Geography
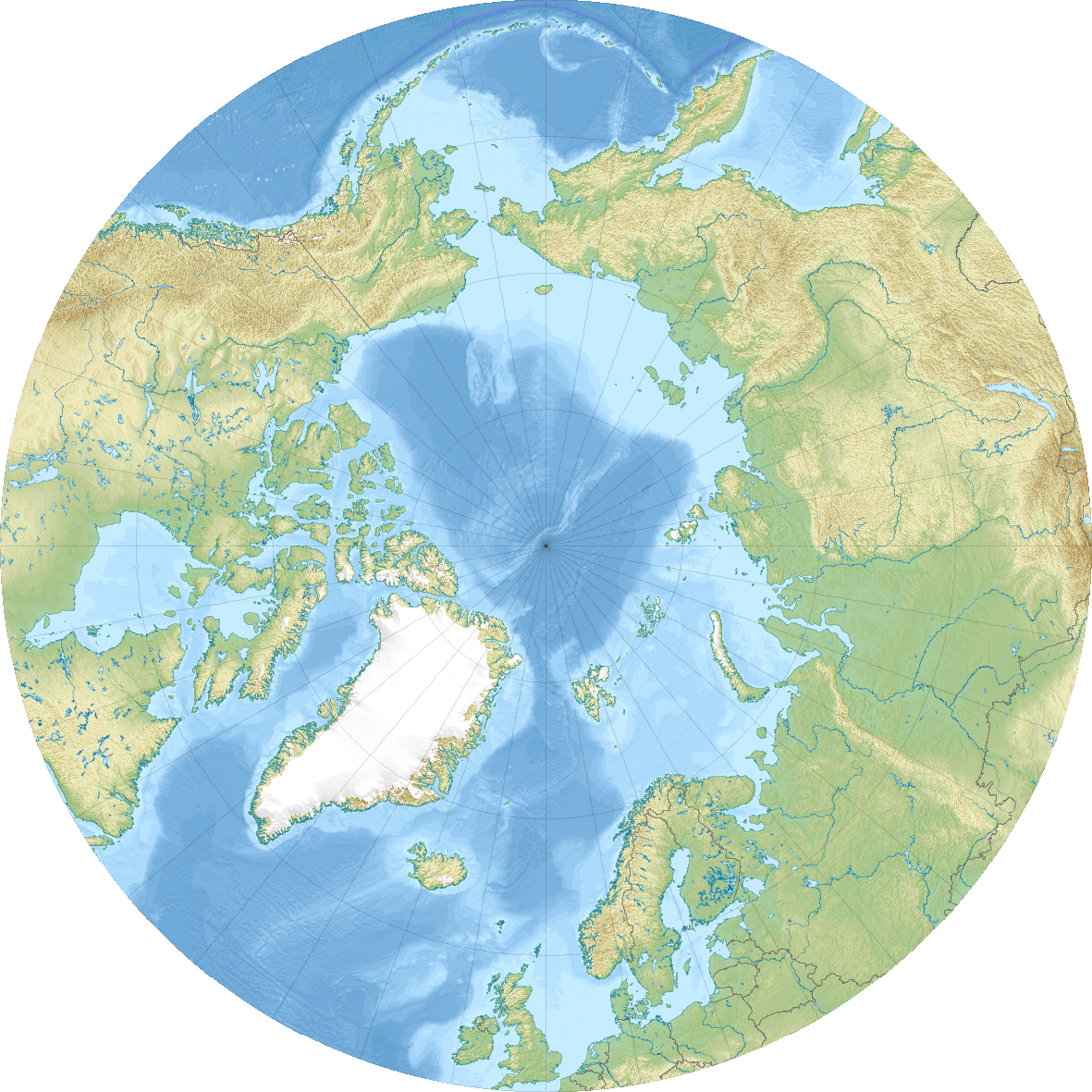
- Location within Svalbard Location within Arctic
- Location: Wedel Jarlsberg Land at Spitsbergen, Svalbard, Norway

Bohlinryggen is a mountain ridge in Wedel Jarlsberg Land at Spitsbergen, Svalbard. It has a length of about 4.5 kilometers, and the highest peak is 716 m.a.s.l. It is located between the glaciers Scottbreen and Renardbreen. The ridge is named after Swedish astronomer Karl Bohlin.
