= Activekammen =

Mountain in Spitsbergen, Norway

- Location within Svalbard

Highest point
- Elevation: 634 m (2,080 ft)
- Coordinates: 77.5041°N 14.4702°E

Geography
- Location: Wedel Jarlsberg Land, Svalbard, Norway

Activekammen is a mountain ridge in Wedel Jarlsberg Land at Spitsbergen, Svalbard. It has a length of about three kilometers, and the highest peak is 634 m.a.s.l. It is located between Vestervågen and the glacier Renardbreen. The ridge is named after the British vessel Active.
