= Dunderdalen =

Valley of Spitsbergen, Norway

Coordinates: 77°26′08″N 14°15′22″E

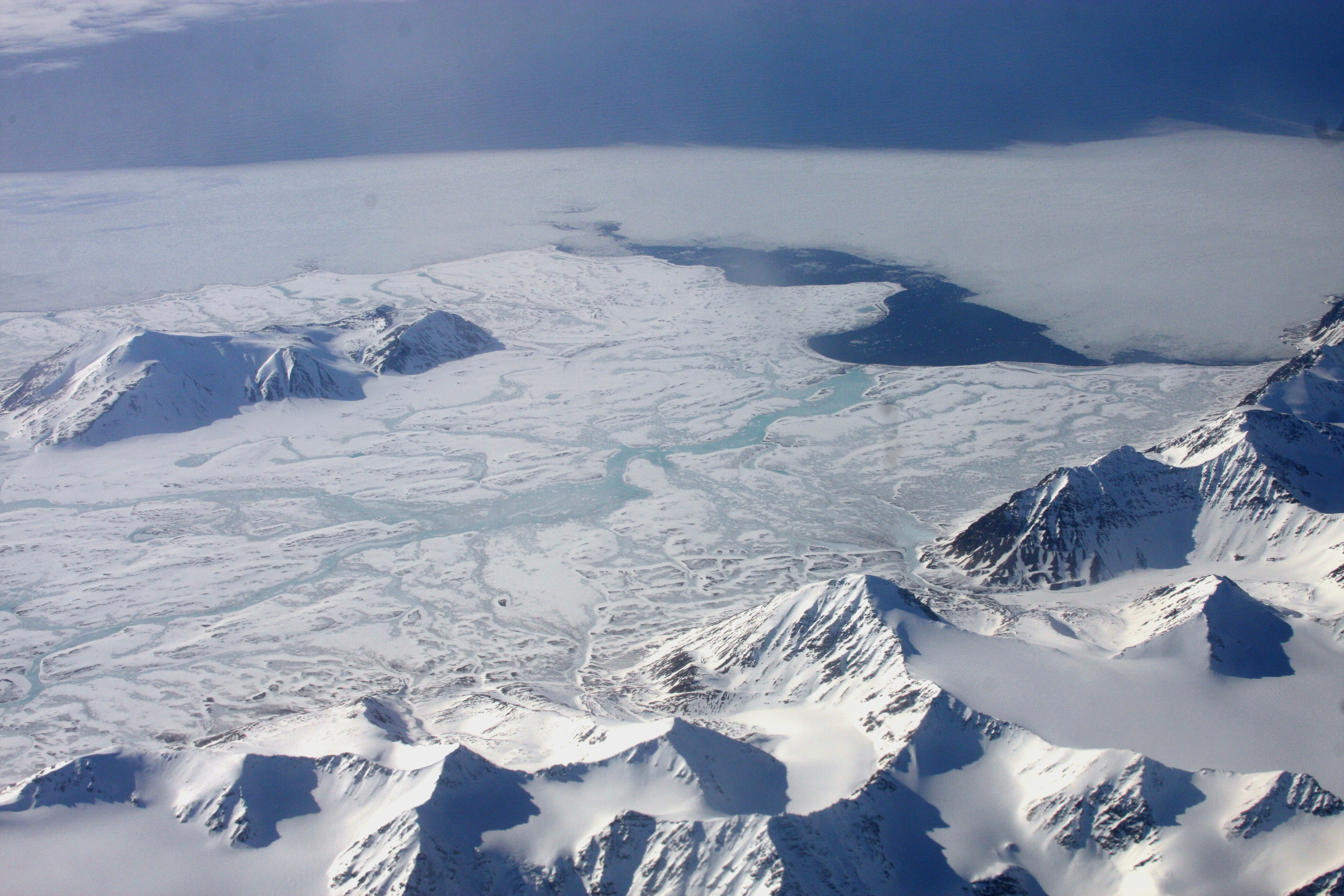
- Dunderdalen, Wedel Jarlsberg Land, southwestern Spitsbergen. Seen from east towards west.]]
- Length: 16 km (9.9 mi)

Naming
- English translation: Thunder valley

Geography
- Country: Norway
- Interactive map of Dunderdalen

Dunderdalen is a valley on Wedel Jarlsberg Land within the Sør-Spitsbergen National Park, on the southwestern part of Spitsbergen, Svalbard. The valley has a length of about 16 km, and opens into Dunderbukta.
