= Wijkanderberget =

Mountain in Svalbard, Norway

Coordinates: 77°33′27″N 14°20′49″E

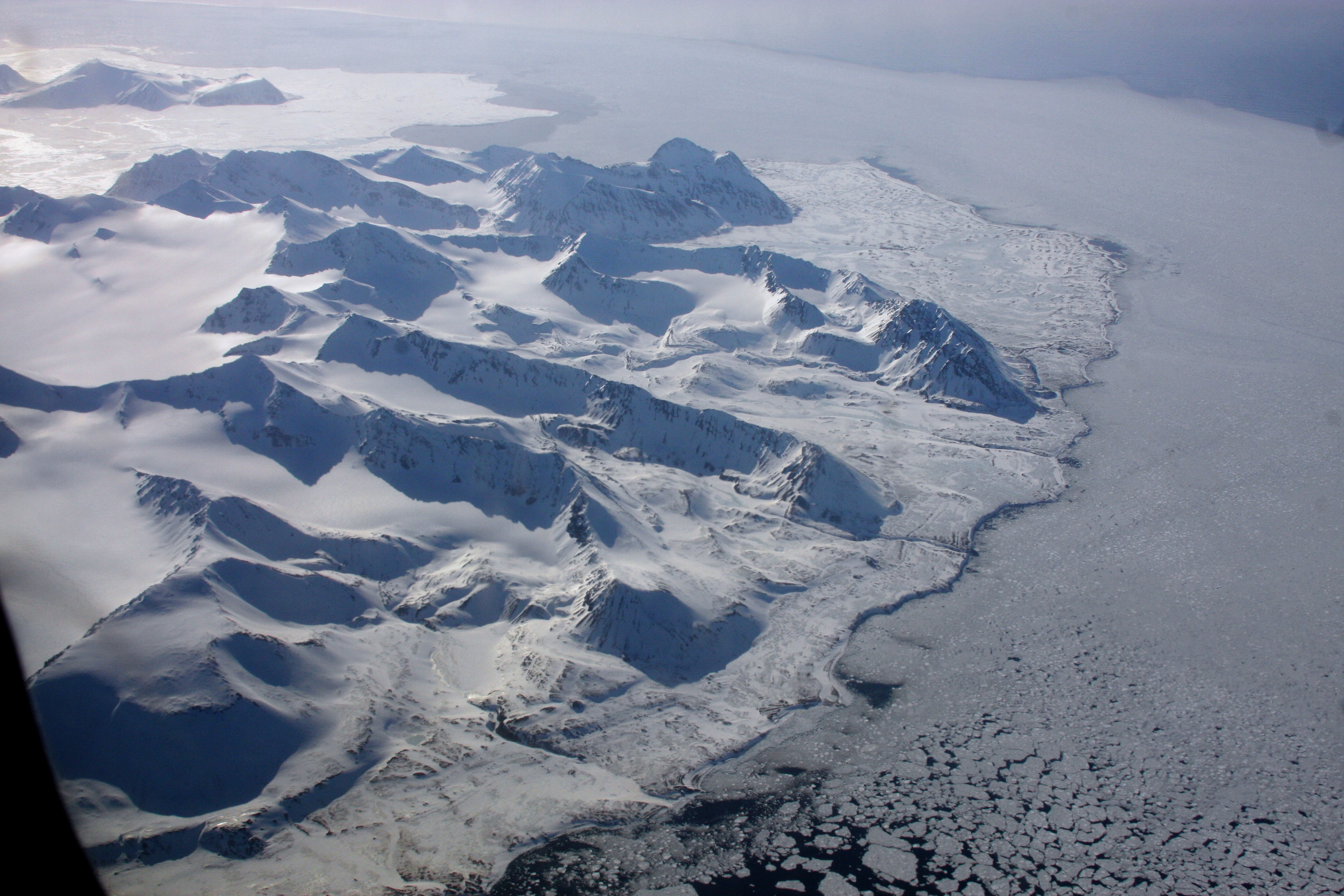
- Wijkanderberget in the lower left corner, surrounded by Scottbreen and Blomlibreen. Further behind are the mountains of Tjørndalsegga/Halvorsenfjellet, Bellsundhesten, Klokkefjellet and Dunderfjellet.

Highest point
- Elevation: 562 m (1,844 ft)

Geography
- Location: Wedel Jarlsberg Land at Spitsbergen, Svalbard, Norway

Wijkanderberget is a mountain in Wedel Jarlsberg Land at Spitsbergen, Svalbard.

It is named after Swedish physicist and astronomer August Wijkander, who joined Nordenskiöld's expedition of 1872. The mountain has two peaks of equal height, 562 m.a.s.l. and is situated between Scottbreen, Blomlibreen and Blomlidalen.
