= Dunderbukta =

Bight in Svalbard, Norway

- Coordinates: 77.4650°N 13.9863°E

Dunderbukta is a bay in Wedel Jarlsberg Land at Spitsbergen, Svalbard. It has a width of approximately 3.5 kn, and is located between the headlands of Tunodden and Ispynten.
