= Renardbreen =

Glacier in Svalbard, Norway

Coordinates: 77.5069°N 14.3398°E

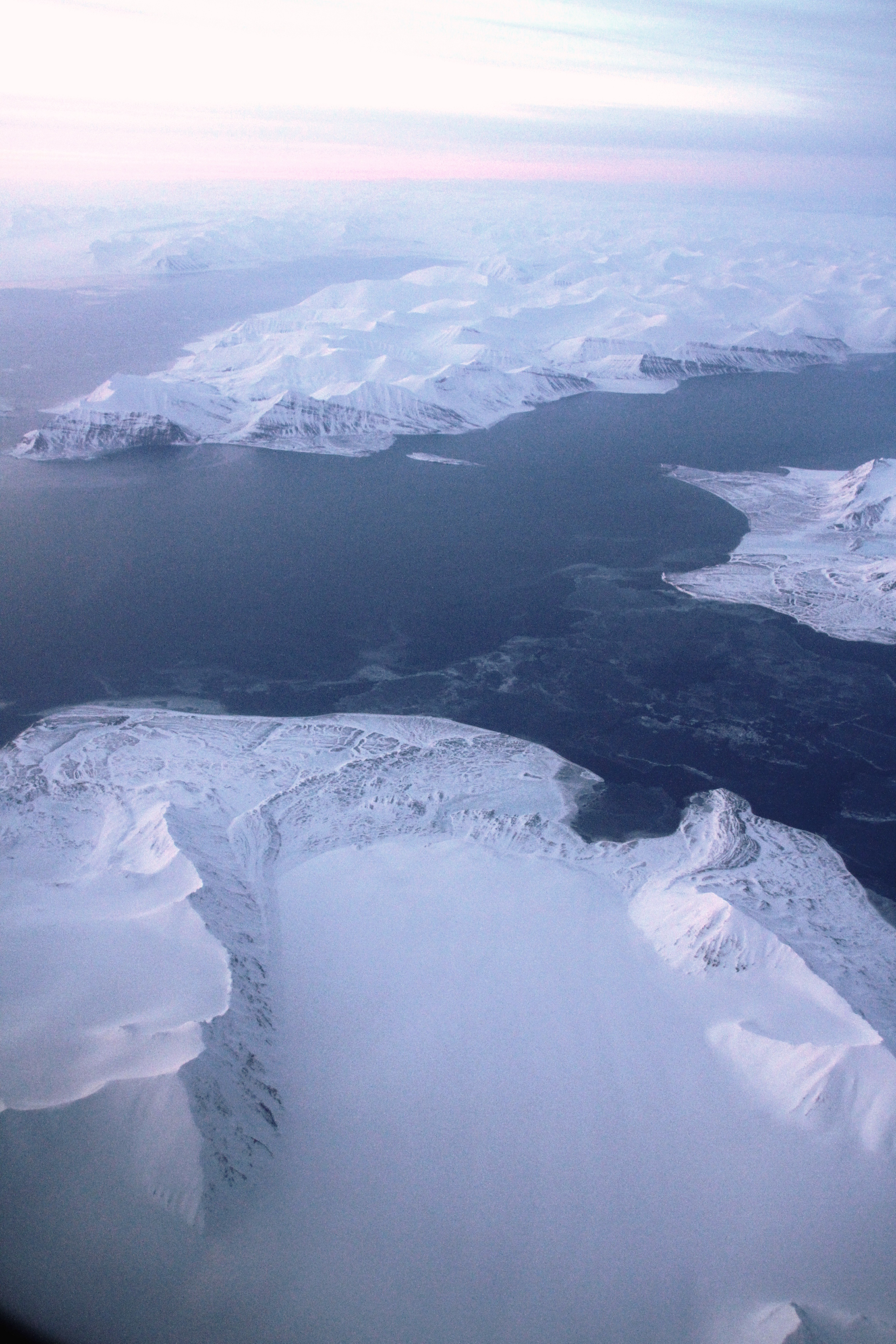
- Renardbreen is situated between the ridges of Bohlinryggen (left) and Activekammen (right).
- Interactive map of Renardbreen
- Location: Wedel Jarlsberg Land at Spitsbergen, Svalbard, Norway
- Length: 8 km (5.0 mi)

Renardbreen (The Fox Glacier) is a glacier in Wedel Jarlsberg Land at Spitsbergen, Svalbard. The glacier has a length of about 8 kilometers (5.0 mi). It is located between the ridges of Activekammen and Bohlinryggen, and debouches into Recherche Fjord.
